

176001–176100 

|-bgcolor=#d6d6d6
| 176001 ||  || — || August 31, 2000 || Socorro || LINEAR || EOS || align=right | 7.1 km || 
|-id=002 bgcolor=#d6d6d6
| 176002 ||  || — || August 21, 2000 || Anderson Mesa || LONEOS || — || align=right | 3.0 km || 
|-id=003 bgcolor=#d6d6d6
| 176003 ||  || — || September 1, 2000 || Socorro || LINEAR || — || align=right | 8.1 km || 
|-id=004 bgcolor=#d6d6d6
| 176004 ||  || — || September 1, 2000 || Socorro || LINEAR || THB || align=right | 5.4 km || 
|-id=005 bgcolor=#d6d6d6
| 176005 ||  || — || September 1, 2000 || Socorro || LINEAR || — || align=right | 5.6 km || 
|-id=006 bgcolor=#fefefe
| 176006 ||  || — || September 7, 2000 || Kitt Peak || Spacewatch || — || align=right | 1.1 km || 
|-id=007 bgcolor=#d6d6d6
| 176007 ||  || — || September 1, 2000 || Socorro || LINEAR || — || align=right | 5.1 km || 
|-id=008 bgcolor=#d6d6d6
| 176008 ||  || — || September 1, 2000 || Socorro || LINEAR || — || align=right | 6.9 km || 
|-id=009 bgcolor=#d6d6d6
| 176009 ||  || — || September 2, 2000 || Anderson Mesa || LONEOS || — || align=right | 6.0 km || 
|-id=010 bgcolor=#fefefe
| 176010 ||  || — || September 2, 2000 || Anderson Mesa || LONEOS || — || align=right | 1.1 km || 
|-id=011 bgcolor=#d6d6d6
| 176011 ||  || — || September 3, 2000 || Socorro || LINEAR || — || align=right | 6.0 km || 
|-id=012 bgcolor=#d6d6d6
| 176012 ||  || — || September 5, 2000 || Anderson Mesa || LONEOS || LIX || align=right | 6.8 km || 
|-id=013 bgcolor=#d6d6d6
| 176013 ||  || — || September 5, 2000 || Anderson Mesa || LONEOS || — || align=right | 7.9 km || 
|-id=014 bgcolor=#d6d6d6
| 176014 Vedrana ||  ||  || September 3, 2000 || Apache Point || SDSS || — || align=right | 4.6 km || 
|-id=015 bgcolor=#d6d6d6
| 176015 || 2000 SR || — || September 19, 2000 || Kitt Peak || Spacewatch || HYG || align=right | 3.8 km || 
|-id=016 bgcolor=#fefefe
| 176016 ||  || — || September 21, 2000 || Socorro || LINEAR || — || align=right | 1.2 km || 
|-id=017 bgcolor=#d6d6d6
| 176017 ||  || — || September 23, 2000 || Socorro || LINEAR || EOS || align=right | 3.9 km || 
|-id=018 bgcolor=#fefefe
| 176018 ||  || — || September 24, 2000 || Socorro || LINEAR || — || align=right | 1.1 km || 
|-id=019 bgcolor=#d6d6d6
| 176019 ||  || — || September 23, 2000 || Socorro || LINEAR || — || align=right | 4.2 km || 
|-id=020 bgcolor=#d6d6d6
| 176020 ||  || — || September 23, 2000 || Socorro || LINEAR || HYG || align=right | 4.6 km || 
|-id=021 bgcolor=#d6d6d6
| 176021 ||  || — || September 23, 2000 || Socorro || LINEAR || — || align=right | 4.9 km || 
|-id=022 bgcolor=#d6d6d6
| 176022 ||  || — || September 24, 2000 || Socorro || LINEAR || — || align=right | 3.6 km || 
|-id=023 bgcolor=#fefefe
| 176023 ||  || — || September 24, 2000 || Socorro || LINEAR || FLO || align=right | 2.0 km || 
|-id=024 bgcolor=#d6d6d6
| 176024 ||  || — || September 24, 2000 || Socorro || LINEAR || — || align=right | 4.5 km || 
|-id=025 bgcolor=#d6d6d6
| 176025 ||  || — || September 24, 2000 || Socorro || LINEAR || — || align=right | 4.1 km || 
|-id=026 bgcolor=#d6d6d6
| 176026 ||  || — || September 24, 2000 || Socorro || LINEAR || — || align=right | 4.5 km || 
|-id=027 bgcolor=#d6d6d6
| 176027 ||  || — || September 25, 2000 || Socorro || LINEAR || — || align=right | 4.8 km || 
|-id=028 bgcolor=#d6d6d6
| 176028 ||  || — || September 23, 2000 || Socorro || LINEAR || — || align=right | 5.3 km || 
|-id=029 bgcolor=#d6d6d6
| 176029 ||  || — || September 23, 2000 || Socorro || LINEAR || — || align=right | 3.2 km || 
|-id=030 bgcolor=#fefefe
| 176030 ||  || — || September 24, 2000 || Socorro || LINEAR || — || align=right | 1.4 km || 
|-id=031 bgcolor=#d6d6d6
| 176031 ||  || — || September 23, 2000 || Socorro || LINEAR || — || align=right | 5.8 km || 
|-id=032 bgcolor=#d6d6d6
| 176032 ||  || — || September 28, 2000 || Socorro || LINEAR || — || align=right | 4.9 km || 
|-id=033 bgcolor=#d6d6d6
| 176033 ||  || — || September 28, 2000 || Socorro || LINEAR || — || align=right | 7.0 km || 
|-id=034 bgcolor=#d6d6d6
| 176034 ||  || — || September 20, 2000 || Haleakala || NEAT || — || align=right | 4.9 km || 
|-id=035 bgcolor=#d6d6d6
| 176035 ||  || — || September 21, 2000 || Kitt Peak || Spacewatch || EOS || align=right | 3.2 km || 
|-id=036 bgcolor=#d6d6d6
| 176036 ||  || — || September 24, 2000 || Socorro || LINEAR || — || align=right | 2.9 km || 
|-id=037 bgcolor=#d6d6d6
| 176037 ||  || — || September 24, 2000 || Socorro || LINEAR || HYG || align=right | 4.2 km || 
|-id=038 bgcolor=#d6d6d6
| 176038 ||  || — || September 25, 2000 || Socorro || LINEAR || — || align=right | 5.1 km || 
|-id=039 bgcolor=#fefefe
| 176039 ||  || — || September 26, 2000 || Socorro || LINEAR || FLO || align=right | 1.0 km || 
|-id=040 bgcolor=#d6d6d6
| 176040 ||  || — || September 27, 2000 || Socorro || LINEAR || EOS || align=right | 2.8 km || 
|-id=041 bgcolor=#d6d6d6
| 176041 ||  || — || September 24, 2000 || Socorro || LINEAR || — || align=right | 5.1 km || 
|-id=042 bgcolor=#d6d6d6
| 176042 ||  || — || September 25, 2000 || Socorro || LINEAR || — || align=right | 4.5 km || 
|-id=043 bgcolor=#fefefe
| 176043 ||  || — || September 27, 2000 || Socorro || LINEAR || — || align=right | 1.1 km || 
|-id=044 bgcolor=#fefefe
| 176044 ||  || — || September 30, 2000 || Socorro || LINEAR || FLO || align=right | 1.3 km || 
|-id=045 bgcolor=#fefefe
| 176045 ||  || — || September 25, 2000 || Socorro || LINEAR || PHO || align=right | 3.2 km || 
|-id=046 bgcolor=#d6d6d6
| 176046 ||  || — || September 26, 2000 || Socorro || LINEAR || — || align=right | 7.4 km || 
|-id=047 bgcolor=#d6d6d6
| 176047 ||  || — || September 18, 2000 || Anderson Mesa || LONEOS || LIX || align=right | 6.7 km || 
|-id=048 bgcolor=#d6d6d6
| 176048 || 2000 TH || — || October 2, 2000 || OCA-Anza Obs. || M. Collins, A. Rudd || EOS || align=right | 3.8 km || 
|-id=049 bgcolor=#d6d6d6
| 176049 ||  || — || October 1, 2000 || Socorro || LINEAR || EOS || align=right | 3.5 km || 
|-id=050 bgcolor=#d6d6d6
| 176050 ||  || — || October 1, 2000 || Socorro || LINEAR || — || align=right | 3.6 km || 
|-id=051 bgcolor=#fefefe
| 176051 ||  || — || October 1, 2000 || Socorro || LINEAR || — || align=right | 1.1 km || 
|-id=052 bgcolor=#d6d6d6
| 176052 ||  || — || October 1, 2000 || Socorro || LINEAR || — || align=right | 5.1 km || 
|-id=053 bgcolor=#d6d6d6
| 176053 ||  || — || October 6, 2000 || Anderson Mesa || LONEOS || HYG || align=right | 3.9 km || 
|-id=054 bgcolor=#E9E9E9
| 176054 ||  || — || October 1, 2000 || Socorro || LINEAR || ADE || align=right | 5.4 km || 
|-id=055 bgcolor=#d6d6d6
| 176055 ||  || — || October 1, 2000 || Anderson Mesa || LONEOS || KOR || align=right | 2.6 km || 
|-id=056 bgcolor=#d6d6d6
| 176056 ||  || — || October 1, 2000 || Socorro || LINEAR || — || align=right | 5.0 km || 
|-id=057 bgcolor=#d6d6d6
| 176057 ||  || — || October 5, 2000 || Kitt Peak || Spacewatch || EOS || align=right | 3.2 km || 
|-id=058 bgcolor=#d6d6d6
| 176058 ||  || — || October 25, 2000 || Socorro || LINEAR || — || align=right | 4.6 km || 
|-id=059 bgcolor=#d6d6d6
| 176059 ||  || — || October 25, 2000 || Socorro || LINEAR || EOS || align=right | 3.4 km || 
|-id=060 bgcolor=#fefefe
| 176060 ||  || — || October 29, 2000 || Kitt Peak || Spacewatch || — || align=right | 1.3 km || 
|-id=061 bgcolor=#fefefe
| 176061 ||  || — || October 24, 2000 || Socorro || LINEAR || — || align=right | 2.4 km || 
|-id=062 bgcolor=#fefefe
| 176062 ||  || — || October 24, 2000 || Socorro || LINEAR || FLO || align=right data-sort-value="0.87" | 870 m || 
|-id=063 bgcolor=#fefefe
| 176063 ||  || — || October 25, 2000 || Socorro || LINEAR || — || align=right | 1.2 km || 
|-id=064 bgcolor=#d6d6d6
| 176064 ||  || — || October 25, 2000 || Socorro || LINEAR || — || align=right | 4.5 km || 
|-id=065 bgcolor=#fefefe
| 176065 ||  || — || November 1, 2000 || Socorro || LINEAR || FLO || align=right data-sort-value="0.94" | 940 m || 
|-id=066 bgcolor=#d6d6d6
| 176066 ||  || — || November 2, 2000 || Socorro || LINEAR || — || align=right | 6.3 km || 
|-id=067 bgcolor=#d6d6d6
| 176067 ||  || — || November 19, 2000 || Socorro || LINEAR || — || align=right | 5.0 km || 
|-id=068 bgcolor=#fefefe
| 176068 ||  || — || November 20, 2000 || Socorro || LINEAR || FLO || align=right | 1.00 km || 
|-id=069 bgcolor=#FA8072
| 176069 ||  || — || November 28, 2000 || Kitt Peak || Spacewatch || — || align=right | 1.3 km || 
|-id=070 bgcolor=#d6d6d6
| 176070 ||  || — || November 19, 2000 || Socorro || LINEAR || — || align=right | 6.6 km || 
|-id=071 bgcolor=#fefefe
| 176071 ||  || — || November 19, 2000 || Socorro || LINEAR || FLO || align=right | 1.0 km || 
|-id=072 bgcolor=#fefefe
| 176072 ||  || — || November 20, 2000 || Socorro || LINEAR || — || align=right | 1.2 km || 
|-id=073 bgcolor=#fefefe
| 176073 ||  || — || November 20, 2000 || Socorro || LINEAR || — || align=right | 1.4 km || 
|-id=074 bgcolor=#fefefe
| 176074 ||  || — || November 20, 2000 || Socorro || LINEAR || FLO || align=right | 1.2 km || 
|-id=075 bgcolor=#fefefe
| 176075 ||  || — || November 20, 2000 || Socorro || LINEAR || FLO || align=right | 1.1 km || 
|-id=076 bgcolor=#fefefe
| 176076 ||  || — || November 30, 2000 || Anderson Mesa || LONEOS || FLO || align=right | 1.5 km || 
|-id=077 bgcolor=#d6d6d6
| 176077 ||  || — || November 19, 2000 || Anderson Mesa || LONEOS || — || align=right | 6.9 km || 
|-id=078 bgcolor=#fefefe
| 176078 ||  || — || December 1, 2000 || Socorro || LINEAR || — || align=right | 1.3 km || 
|-id=079 bgcolor=#fefefe
| 176079 ||  || — || December 4, 2000 || Socorro || LINEAR || — || align=right | 1.2 km || 
|-id=080 bgcolor=#fefefe
| 176080 ||  || — || December 4, 2000 || Socorro || LINEAR || — || align=right | 1.6 km || 
|-id=081 bgcolor=#fefefe
| 176081 ||  || — || December 4, 2000 || Socorro || LINEAR || — || align=right | 1.4 km || 
|-id=082 bgcolor=#fefefe
| 176082 ||  || — || December 5, 2000 || Socorro || LINEAR || PHO || align=right | 2.3 km || 
|-id=083 bgcolor=#fefefe
| 176083 ||  || — || December 15, 2000 || Socorro || LINEAR || PHO || align=right | 2.0 km || 
|-id=084 bgcolor=#fefefe
| 176084 ||  || — || December 22, 2000 || Socorro || LINEAR || — || align=right | 1.2 km || 
|-id=085 bgcolor=#fefefe
| 176085 ||  || — || December 23, 2000 || Kitt Peak || Spacewatch || NYS || align=right | 1.7 km || 
|-id=086 bgcolor=#fefefe
| 176086 ||  || — || December 20, 2000 || Socorro || LINEAR || — || align=right | 1.5 km || 
|-id=087 bgcolor=#fefefe
| 176087 ||  || — || December 30, 2000 || Socorro || LINEAR || V || align=right | 1.2 km || 
|-id=088 bgcolor=#fefefe
| 176088 ||  || — || December 30, 2000 || Socorro || LINEAR || FLO || align=right | 1.00 km || 
|-id=089 bgcolor=#fefefe
| 176089 ||  || — || December 30, 2000 || Socorro || LINEAR || — || align=right | 1.5 km || 
|-id=090 bgcolor=#fefefe
| 176090 ||  || — || December 30, 2000 || Socorro || LINEAR || FLO || align=right | 1.00 km || 
|-id=091 bgcolor=#fefefe
| 176091 ||  || — || December 30, 2000 || Socorro || LINEAR || FLO || align=right data-sort-value="0.99" | 990 m || 
|-id=092 bgcolor=#fefefe
| 176092 ||  || — || December 30, 2000 || Socorro || LINEAR || FLO || align=right | 1.0 km || 
|-id=093 bgcolor=#fefefe
| 176093 ||  || — || December 30, 2000 || Socorro || LINEAR || — || align=right | 1.5 km || 
|-id=094 bgcolor=#fefefe
| 176094 ||  || — || January 3, 2001 || Socorro || LINEAR || — || align=right | 1.8 km || 
|-id=095 bgcolor=#fefefe
| 176095 ||  || — || January 4, 2001 || Socorro || LINEAR || — || align=right | 1.5 km || 
|-id=096 bgcolor=#fefefe
| 176096 ||  || — || January 18, 2001 || Socorro || LINEAR || — || align=right | 2.4 km || 
|-id=097 bgcolor=#fefefe
| 176097 ||  || — || January 16, 2001 || Kitt Peak || Spacewatch || — || align=right data-sort-value="0.77" | 770 m || 
|-id=098 bgcolor=#fefefe
| 176098 ||  || — || January 18, 2001 || Socorro || LINEAR || — || align=right | 3.2 km || 
|-id=099 bgcolor=#fefefe
| 176099 ||  || — || January 19, 2001 || Socorro || LINEAR || — || align=right | 1.2 km || 
|-id=100 bgcolor=#fefefe
| 176100 ||  || — || January 20, 2001 || Socorro || LINEAR || — || align=right | 1.6 km || 
|}

176101–176200 

|-bgcolor=#fefefe
| 176101 ||  || — || January 21, 2001 || Socorro || LINEAR || FLO || align=right | 1.0 km || 
|-id=102 bgcolor=#FA8072
| 176102 ||  || — || January 26, 2001 || Socorro || LINEAR || PHO || align=right | 1.8 km || 
|-id=103 bgcolor=#fefefe
| 176103 Waynejohnson ||  ||  || January 30, 2001 || Junk Bond || D. Healy || — || align=right data-sort-value="0.98" | 980 m || 
|-id=104 bgcolor=#fefefe
| 176104 ||  || — || January 26, 2001 || Socorro || LINEAR || — || align=right | 1.5 km || 
|-id=105 bgcolor=#fefefe
| 176105 ||  || — || February 1, 2001 || Socorro || LINEAR || FLO || align=right | 1.1 km || 
|-id=106 bgcolor=#fefefe
| 176106 ||  || — || February 1, 2001 || Socorro || LINEAR || — || align=right | 1.4 km || 
|-id=107 bgcolor=#fefefe
| 176107 ||  || — || February 1, 2001 || Socorro || LINEAR || FLO || align=right | 1.1 km || 
|-id=108 bgcolor=#fefefe
| 176108 ||  || — || February 15, 2001 || Socorro || LINEAR || PHO || align=right | 3.8 km || 
|-id=109 bgcolor=#fefefe
| 176109 ||  || — || February 16, 2001 || Črni Vrh || Črni Vrh || — || align=right | 2.7 km || 
|-id=110 bgcolor=#fefefe
| 176110 ||  || — || February 16, 2001 || Oizumi || T. Kobayashi || — || align=right | 1.4 km || 
|-id=111 bgcolor=#fefefe
| 176111 ||  || — || February 16, 2001 || Socorro || LINEAR || V || align=right | 1.2 km || 
|-id=112 bgcolor=#fefefe
| 176112 ||  || — || February 16, 2001 || Socorro || LINEAR || — || align=right | 1.4 km || 
|-id=113 bgcolor=#fefefe
| 176113 ||  || — || February 17, 2001 || Socorro || LINEAR || — || align=right | 1.1 km || 
|-id=114 bgcolor=#fefefe
| 176114 ||  || — || February 16, 2001 || Kitt Peak || Spacewatch || — || align=right | 1.2 km || 
|-id=115 bgcolor=#fefefe
| 176115 ||  || — || February 19, 2001 || Socorro || LINEAR || V || align=right | 1.0 km || 
|-id=116 bgcolor=#fefefe
| 176116 ||  || — || February 19, 2001 || Socorro || LINEAR || NYS || align=right data-sort-value="0.85" | 850 m || 
|-id=117 bgcolor=#fefefe
| 176117 ||  || — || February 19, 2001 || Socorro || LINEAR || — || align=right | 1.3 km || 
|-id=118 bgcolor=#fefefe
| 176118 ||  || — || February 20, 2001 || Socorro || LINEAR || — || align=right | 1.1 km || 
|-id=119 bgcolor=#fefefe
| 176119 ||  || — || February 22, 2001 || Kitt Peak || Spacewatch || V || align=right data-sort-value="0.86" | 860 m || 
|-id=120 bgcolor=#fefefe
| 176120 ||  || — || February 22, 2001 || Kitt Peak || Spacewatch || V || align=right data-sort-value="0.99" | 990 m || 
|-id=121 bgcolor=#fefefe
| 176121 ||  || — || February 23, 2001 || Kitt Peak || Spacewatch || FLO || align=right | 1.0 km || 
|-id=122 bgcolor=#fefefe
| 176122 ||  || — || February 24, 2001 || Haleakala || NEAT || — || align=right | 4.0 km || 
|-id=123 bgcolor=#FA8072
| 176123 ||  || — || February 17, 2001 || Socorro || LINEAR || — || align=right | 1.4 km || 
|-id=124 bgcolor=#fefefe
| 176124 ||  || — || February 22, 2001 || Socorro || LINEAR || — || align=right | 2.1 km || 
|-id=125 bgcolor=#fefefe
| 176125 ||  || — || February 17, 2001 || Socorro || LINEAR || — || align=right | 1.5 km || 
|-id=126 bgcolor=#fefefe
| 176126 ||  || — || March 2, 2001 || Anderson Mesa || LONEOS || — || align=right | 1.4 km || 
|-id=127 bgcolor=#fefefe
| 176127 ||  || — || March 2, 2001 || Haleakala || NEAT || — || align=right | 3.3 km || 
|-id=128 bgcolor=#fefefe
| 176128 ||  || — || March 15, 2001 || Kitt Peak || Spacewatch || — || align=right | 1.4 km || 
|-id=129 bgcolor=#fefefe
| 176129 ||  || — || March 16, 2001 || Socorro || LINEAR || V || align=right | 1.2 km || 
|-id=130 bgcolor=#fefefe
| 176130 ||  || — || March 18, 2001 || Socorro || LINEAR || NYS || align=right | 1.4 km || 
|-id=131 bgcolor=#fefefe
| 176131 ||  || — || March 19, 2001 || Anderson Mesa || LONEOS || NYS || align=right | 1.00 km || 
|-id=132 bgcolor=#fefefe
| 176132 ||  || — || March 19, 2001 || Anderson Mesa || LONEOS || — || align=right | 1.3 km || 
|-id=133 bgcolor=#fefefe
| 176133 ||  || — || March 19, 2001 || Anderson Mesa || LONEOS || — || align=right | 3.0 km || 
|-id=134 bgcolor=#fefefe
| 176134 ||  || — || March 19, 2001 || Anderson Mesa || LONEOS || — || align=right | 1.5 km || 
|-id=135 bgcolor=#fefefe
| 176135 ||  || — || March 18, 2001 || Socorro || LINEAR || NYS || align=right | 1.1 km || 
|-id=136 bgcolor=#fefefe
| 176136 ||  || — || March 18, 2001 || Socorro || LINEAR || PHO || align=right | 1.6 km || 
|-id=137 bgcolor=#fefefe
| 176137 ||  || — || March 18, 2001 || Socorro || LINEAR || NYS || align=right | 1.3 km || 
|-id=138 bgcolor=#fefefe
| 176138 ||  || — || March 19, 2001 || Socorro || LINEAR || — || align=right | 1.2 km || 
|-id=139 bgcolor=#fefefe
| 176139 ||  || — || March 19, 2001 || Socorro || LINEAR || V || align=right data-sort-value="0.97" | 970 m || 
|-id=140 bgcolor=#fefefe
| 176140 ||  || — || March 19, 2001 || Socorro || LINEAR || NYS || align=right | 1.3 km || 
|-id=141 bgcolor=#fefefe
| 176141 ||  || — || March 19, 2001 || Socorro || LINEAR || FLO || align=right | 1.3 km || 
|-id=142 bgcolor=#fefefe
| 176142 ||  || — || March 19, 2001 || Socorro || LINEAR || — || align=right | 1.4 km || 
|-id=143 bgcolor=#fefefe
| 176143 ||  || — || March 26, 2001 || Kitt Peak || Spacewatch || NYS || align=right | 2.0 km || 
|-id=144 bgcolor=#fefefe
| 176144 ||  || — || March 26, 2001 || Kitt Peak || Spacewatch || NYS || align=right data-sort-value="0.96" | 960 m || 
|-id=145 bgcolor=#fefefe
| 176145 ||  || — || March 24, 2001 || Socorro || LINEAR || NYS || align=right | 1.0 km || 
|-id=146 bgcolor=#fefefe
| 176146 ||  || — || March 29, 2001 || Anderson Mesa || LONEOS || — || align=right | 1.3 km || 
|-id=147 bgcolor=#fefefe
| 176147 ||  || — || March 23, 2001 || Anderson Mesa || LONEOS || NYS || align=right | 1.0 km || 
|-id=148 bgcolor=#fefefe
| 176148 ||  || — || March 26, 2001 || Socorro || LINEAR || — || align=right | 2.6 km || 
|-id=149 bgcolor=#fefefe
| 176149 ||  || — || March 27, 2001 || Anderson Mesa || LONEOS || — || align=right | 1.5 km || 
|-id=150 bgcolor=#fefefe
| 176150 ||  || — || March 29, 2001 || Haleakala || NEAT || — || align=right | 1.4 km || 
|-id=151 bgcolor=#fefefe
| 176151 ||  || — || March 24, 2001 || Haleakala || NEAT || — || align=right | 1.5 km || 
|-id=152 bgcolor=#fefefe
| 176152 ||  || — || March 24, 2001 || Kitt Peak || Spacewatch || EUT || align=right | 1.0 km || 
|-id=153 bgcolor=#fefefe
| 176153 ||  || — || March 25, 2001 || Kitt Peak || Kitt Peak Obs. || — || align=right | 1.2 km || 
|-id=154 bgcolor=#fefefe
| 176154 || 2001 GA || — || April 1, 2001 || Ondřejov || P. Kušnirák || FLO || align=right | 1.1 km || 
|-id=155 bgcolor=#fefefe
| 176155 ||  || — || April 13, 2001 || Kitt Peak || Spacewatch || NYS || align=right data-sort-value="0.68" | 680 m || 
|-id=156 bgcolor=#fefefe
| 176156 ||  || — || April 15, 2001 || Haleakala || NEAT || — || align=right | 1.2 km || 
|-id=157 bgcolor=#fefefe
| 176157 ||  || — || April 18, 2001 || Socorro || LINEAR || NYS || align=right | 1.1 km || 
|-id=158 bgcolor=#d6d6d6
| 176158 ||  || — || April 23, 2001 || Socorro || LINEAR || 3:2 || align=right | 9.6 km || 
|-id=159 bgcolor=#fefefe
| 176159 ||  || — || April 26, 2001 || Desert Beaver || W. K. Y. Yeung || — || align=right | 1.7 km || 
|-id=160 bgcolor=#fefefe
| 176160 ||  || — || April 16, 2001 || Anderson Mesa || LONEOS || — || align=right | 1.3 km || 
|-id=161 bgcolor=#fefefe
| 176161 ||  || — || April 16, 2001 || Anderson Mesa || LONEOS || NYS || align=right data-sort-value="0.93" | 930 m || 
|-id=162 bgcolor=#fefefe
| 176162 ||  || — || April 24, 2001 || Socorro || LINEAR || — || align=right | 1.6 km || 
|-id=163 bgcolor=#fefefe
| 176163 || 2001 JV || — || May 12, 2001 || Eskridge || G. Hug || NYS || align=right | 1.0 km || 
|-id=164 bgcolor=#fefefe
| 176164 ||  || — || May 15, 2001 || Haleakala || NEAT || — || align=right | 1.7 km || 
|-id=165 bgcolor=#fefefe
| 176165 ||  || — || May 15, 2001 || Anderson Mesa || LONEOS || — || align=right | 1.7 km || 
|-id=166 bgcolor=#fefefe
| 176166 ||  || — || May 15, 2001 || Palomar || NEAT || — || align=right | 1.5 km || 
|-id=167 bgcolor=#E9E9E9
| 176167 ||  || — || May 17, 2001 || Socorro || LINEAR || — || align=right | 3.6 km || 
|-id=168 bgcolor=#E9E9E9
| 176168 ||  || — || May 17, 2001 || Socorro || LINEAR || — || align=right | 1.9 km || 
|-id=169 bgcolor=#fefefe
| 176169 ||  || — || May 17, 2001 || Socorro || LINEAR || NYS || align=right | 1.2 km || 
|-id=170 bgcolor=#fefefe
| 176170 ||  || — || May 18, 2001 || Socorro || LINEAR || NYS || align=right | 1.2 km || 
|-id=171 bgcolor=#fefefe
| 176171 ||  || — || May 22, 2001 || Socorro || LINEAR || — || align=right | 1.7 km || 
|-id=172 bgcolor=#fefefe
| 176172 ||  || — || May 18, 2001 || Anderson Mesa || LONEOS || NYS || align=right | 1.3 km || 
|-id=173 bgcolor=#fefefe
| 176173 ||  || — || May 30, 2001 || Socorro || LINEAR || PHO || align=right | 3.4 km || 
|-id=174 bgcolor=#E9E9E9
| 176174 ||  || — || May 29, 2001 || Socorro || LINEAR || — || align=right | 2.5 km || 
|-id=175 bgcolor=#fefefe
| 176175 ||  || — || May 24, 2001 || Anderson Mesa || LONEOS || — || align=right | 1.4 km || 
|-id=176 bgcolor=#fefefe
| 176176 ||  || — || May 24, 2001 || Anderson Mesa || LONEOS || NYS || align=right | 1.2 km || 
|-id=177 bgcolor=#E9E9E9
| 176177 ||  || — || June 20, 2001 || Palomar || NEAT || — || align=right | 2.6 km || 
|-id=178 bgcolor=#E9E9E9
| 176178 ||  || — || June 27, 2001 || Palomar || NEAT || — || align=right | 1.7 km || 
|-id=179 bgcolor=#fefefe
| 176179 ||  || — || June 28, 2001 || Palomar || NEAT || NYS || align=right | 1.1 km || 
|-id=180 bgcolor=#E9E9E9
| 176180 ||  || — || July 13, 2001 || Palomar || NEAT || — || align=right | 3.0 km || 
|-id=181 bgcolor=#E9E9E9
| 176181 ||  || — || July 13, 2001 || Palomar || NEAT || TIN || align=right | 1.6 km || 
|-id=182 bgcolor=#d6d6d6
| 176182 ||  || — || July 13, 2001 || Palomar || NEAT || — || align=right | 3.6 km || 
|-id=183 bgcolor=#E9E9E9
| 176183 ||  || — || July 18, 2001 || Palomar || NEAT || — || align=right | 3.2 km || 
|-id=184 bgcolor=#E9E9E9
| 176184 ||  || — || July 17, 2001 || Anderson Mesa || LONEOS || — || align=right | 2.2 km || 
|-id=185 bgcolor=#d6d6d6
| 176185 ||  || — || July 21, 2001 || Palomar || NEAT || — || align=right | 5.6 km || 
|-id=186 bgcolor=#E9E9E9
| 176186 ||  || — || July 19, 2001 || Palomar || NEAT || — || align=right | 2.4 km || 
|-id=187 bgcolor=#E9E9E9
| 176187 ||  || — || July 23, 2001 || Palomar || NEAT || — || align=right | 2.2 km || 
|-id=188 bgcolor=#fefefe
| 176188 ||  || — || July 19, 2001 || Palomar || NEAT || H || align=right data-sort-value="0.90" | 900 m || 
|-id=189 bgcolor=#E9E9E9
| 176189 ||  || — || July 21, 2001 || Palomar || NEAT || — || align=right | 2.2 km || 
|-id=190 bgcolor=#E9E9E9
| 176190 ||  || — || July 17, 2001 || Palomar || NEAT || — || align=right | 3.0 km || 
|-id=191 bgcolor=#E9E9E9
| 176191 ||  || — || July 21, 2001 || Palomar || NEAT || — || align=right | 2.5 km || 
|-id=192 bgcolor=#E9E9E9
| 176192 ||  || — || July 19, 2001 || Palomar || NEAT || — || align=right | 1.9 km || 
|-id=193 bgcolor=#E9E9E9
| 176193 ||  || — || July 23, 2001 || Haleakala || NEAT || — || align=right | 2.6 km || 
|-id=194 bgcolor=#E9E9E9
| 176194 ||  || — || July 16, 2001 || Anderson Mesa || LONEOS || — || align=right | 3.5 km || 
|-id=195 bgcolor=#E9E9E9
| 176195 ||  || — || July 23, 2001 || Palomar || NEAT || — || align=right | 5.3 km || 
|-id=196 bgcolor=#fefefe
| 176196 ||  || — || July 25, 2001 || Haleakala || NEAT || H || align=right | 1.2 km || 
|-id=197 bgcolor=#E9E9E9
| 176197 ||  || — || July 27, 2001 || Anderson Mesa || LONEOS || — || align=right | 3.2 km || 
|-id=198 bgcolor=#E9E9E9
| 176198 ||  || — || August 3, 2001 || Haleakala || NEAT || GEF || align=right | 2.4 km || 
|-id=199 bgcolor=#E9E9E9
| 176199 ||  || — || August 3, 2001 || Haleakala || NEAT || MAR || align=right | 2.2 km || 
|-id=200 bgcolor=#E9E9E9
| 176200 ||  || — || August 6, 2001 || Haleakala || NEAT || — || align=right | 2.1 km || 
|}

176201–176300 

|-bgcolor=#E9E9E9
| 176201 ||  || — || August 11, 2001 || Palomar || NEAT || — || align=right | 3.3 km || 
|-id=202 bgcolor=#E9E9E9
| 176202 ||  || — || August 11, 2001 || Haleakala || NEAT || — || align=right | 3.0 km || 
|-id=203 bgcolor=#E9E9E9
| 176203 ||  || — || August 10, 2001 || Palomar || NEAT || — || align=right | 1.7 km || 
|-id=204 bgcolor=#E9E9E9
| 176204 ||  || — || August 14, 2001 || Haleakala || NEAT || — || align=right | 1.9 km || 
|-id=205 bgcolor=#d6d6d6
| 176205 ||  || — || August 14, 2001 || Haleakala || NEAT || — || align=right | 3.0 km || 
|-id=206 bgcolor=#fefefe
| 176206 ||  || — || August 14, 2001 || Haleakala || NEAT || H || align=right | 1.0 km || 
|-id=207 bgcolor=#E9E9E9
| 176207 ||  || — || August 16, 2001 || Socorro || LINEAR || — || align=right | 2.7 km || 
|-id=208 bgcolor=#E9E9E9
| 176208 ||  || — || August 16, 2001 || Socorro || LINEAR || — || align=right | 3.7 km || 
|-id=209 bgcolor=#E9E9E9
| 176209 ||  || — || August 16, 2001 || Socorro || LINEAR || — || align=right | 3.1 km || 
|-id=210 bgcolor=#E9E9E9
| 176210 ||  || — || August 16, 2001 || Socorro || LINEAR || — || align=right | 1.8 km || 
|-id=211 bgcolor=#E9E9E9
| 176211 ||  || — || August 16, 2001 || Socorro || LINEAR || — || align=right | 2.3 km || 
|-id=212 bgcolor=#E9E9E9
| 176212 ||  || — || August 16, 2001 || Socorro || LINEAR || AGN || align=right | 2.2 km || 
|-id=213 bgcolor=#E9E9E9
| 176213 ||  || — || August 16, 2001 || Socorro || LINEAR || — || align=right | 2.0 km || 
|-id=214 bgcolor=#E9E9E9
| 176214 ||  || — || August 16, 2001 || Socorro || LINEAR || — || align=right | 2.4 km || 
|-id=215 bgcolor=#fefefe
| 176215 ||  || — || August 16, 2001 || Socorro || LINEAR || H || align=right | 1.2 km || 
|-id=216 bgcolor=#d6d6d6
| 176216 ||  || — || August 16, 2001 || Palomar || NEAT || — || align=right | 4.2 km || 
|-id=217 bgcolor=#d6d6d6
| 176217 ||  || — || August 17, 2001 || Socorro || LINEAR || — || align=right | 5.2 km || 
|-id=218 bgcolor=#fefefe
| 176218 ||  || — || August 21, 2001 || Haleakala || NEAT || NYS || align=right | 1.2 km || 
|-id=219 bgcolor=#d6d6d6
| 176219 ||  || — || August 20, 2001 || Palomar || NEAT || — || align=right | 4.6 km || 
|-id=220 bgcolor=#E9E9E9
| 176220 ||  || — || August 19, 2001 || Socorro || LINEAR || — || align=right | 2.0 km || 
|-id=221 bgcolor=#E9E9E9
| 176221 ||  || — || August 17, 2001 || Socorro || LINEAR || — || align=right | 1.7 km || 
|-id=222 bgcolor=#fefefe
| 176222 ||  || — || August 23, 2001 || Socorro || LINEAR || H || align=right data-sort-value="0.85" | 850 m || 
|-id=223 bgcolor=#E9E9E9
| 176223 ||  || — || August 18, 2001 || Socorro || LINEAR || GEF || align=right | 2.9 km || 
|-id=224 bgcolor=#E9E9E9
| 176224 ||  || — || August 19, 2001 || Socorro || LINEAR || — || align=right | 3.6 km || 
|-id=225 bgcolor=#E9E9E9
| 176225 ||  || — || August 19, 2001 || Socorro || LINEAR || — || align=right | 1.8 km || 
|-id=226 bgcolor=#E9E9E9
| 176226 ||  || — || August 19, 2001 || Socorro || LINEAR || — || align=right | 5.0 km || 
|-id=227 bgcolor=#E9E9E9
| 176227 ||  || — || August 21, 2001 || Socorro || LINEAR || — || align=right | 2.2 km || 
|-id=228 bgcolor=#d6d6d6
| 176228 ||  || — || August 22, 2001 || Socorro || LINEAR || — || align=right | 6.0 km || 
|-id=229 bgcolor=#d6d6d6
| 176229 ||  || — || August 26, 2001 || Prescott || P. G. Comba || — || align=right | 3.1 km || 
|-id=230 bgcolor=#d6d6d6
| 176230 ||  || — || August 23, 2001 || Socorro || LINEAR || Tj (2.91) || align=right | 4.8 km || 
|-id=231 bgcolor=#E9E9E9
| 176231 ||  || — || August 23, 2001 || Anderson Mesa || LONEOS || — || align=right | 4.5 km || 
|-id=232 bgcolor=#E9E9E9
| 176232 ||  || — || August 23, 2001 || Anderson Mesa || LONEOS || — || align=right | 1.9 km || 
|-id=233 bgcolor=#E9E9E9
| 176233 ||  || — || August 23, 2001 || Anderson Mesa || LONEOS || — || align=right | 3.8 km || 
|-id=234 bgcolor=#E9E9E9
| 176234 ||  || — || August 24, 2001 || Haleakala || NEAT || — || align=right | 3.7 km || 
|-id=235 bgcolor=#E9E9E9
| 176235 ||  || — || August 24, 2001 || Haleakala || NEAT || MAR || align=right | 1.8 km || 
|-id=236 bgcolor=#E9E9E9
| 176236 ||  || — || August 23, 2001 || Anderson Mesa || LONEOS || — || align=right | 3.8 km || 
|-id=237 bgcolor=#E9E9E9
| 176237 ||  || — || August 23, 2001 || Anderson Mesa || LONEOS || — || align=right | 2.7 km || 
|-id=238 bgcolor=#E9E9E9
| 176238 ||  || — || August 23, 2001 || Anderson Mesa || LONEOS || — || align=right | 3.3 km || 
|-id=239 bgcolor=#E9E9E9
| 176239 ||  || — || August 23, 2001 || Anderson Mesa || LONEOS || WIT || align=right | 2.0 km || 
|-id=240 bgcolor=#E9E9E9
| 176240 ||  || — || August 23, 2001 || Anderson Mesa || LONEOS || — || align=right | 2.9 km || 
|-id=241 bgcolor=#d6d6d6
| 176241 ||  || — || August 24, 2001 || Anderson Mesa || LONEOS || — || align=right | 3.6 km || 
|-id=242 bgcolor=#E9E9E9
| 176242 ||  || — || August 24, 2001 || Socorro || LINEAR || DOR || align=right | 4.5 km || 
|-id=243 bgcolor=#E9E9E9
| 176243 ||  || — || August 24, 2001 || Socorro || LINEAR || — || align=right | 3.9 km || 
|-id=244 bgcolor=#E9E9E9
| 176244 ||  || — || August 24, 2001 || Socorro || LINEAR || GAL || align=right | 2.9 km || 
|-id=245 bgcolor=#E9E9E9
| 176245 ||  || — || August 24, 2001 || Socorro || LINEAR || — || align=right | 4.4 km || 
|-id=246 bgcolor=#E9E9E9
| 176246 ||  || — || August 24, 2001 || Socorro || LINEAR || — || align=right | 4.9 km || 
|-id=247 bgcolor=#E9E9E9
| 176247 ||  || — || August 25, 2001 || Socorro || LINEAR || — || align=right | 2.0 km || 
|-id=248 bgcolor=#d6d6d6
| 176248 ||  || — || August 25, 2001 || Socorro || LINEAR || IMH || align=right | 5.6 km || 
|-id=249 bgcolor=#d6d6d6
| 176249 ||  || — || August 25, 2001 || Socorro || LINEAR || — || align=right | 4.4 km || 
|-id=250 bgcolor=#E9E9E9
| 176250 ||  || — || August 19, 2001 || Socorro || LINEAR || — || align=right | 4.0 km || 
|-id=251 bgcolor=#E9E9E9
| 176251 ||  || — || August 19, 2001 || Socorro || LINEAR || — || align=right | 2.3 km || 
|-id=252 bgcolor=#E9E9E9
| 176252 ||  || — || August 16, 2001 || Socorro || LINEAR || — || align=right | 1.4 km || 
|-id=253 bgcolor=#E9E9E9
| 176253 ||  || — || August 16, 2001 || Socorro || LINEAR || — || align=right | 4.1 km || 
|-id=254 bgcolor=#E9E9E9
| 176254 ||  || — || August 24, 2001 || Anderson Mesa || LONEOS || — || align=right | 3.9 km || 
|-id=255 bgcolor=#E9E9E9
| 176255 ||  || — || August 24, 2001 || Socorro || LINEAR || VIB || align=right | 4.1 km || 
|-id=256 bgcolor=#E9E9E9
| 176256 ||  || — || September 9, 2001 || Desert Eagle || W. K. Y. Yeung || — || align=right | 2.4 km || 
|-id=257 bgcolor=#fefefe
| 176257 ||  || — || September 9, 2001 || Socorro || LINEAR || H || align=right data-sort-value="0.99" | 990 m || 
|-id=258 bgcolor=#E9E9E9
| 176258 ||  || — || September 11, 2001 || Socorro || LINEAR || — || align=right | 3.4 km || 
|-id=259 bgcolor=#E9E9E9
| 176259 ||  || — || September 7, 2001 || Socorro || LINEAR || HEN || align=right | 1.7 km || 
|-id=260 bgcolor=#E9E9E9
| 176260 ||  || — || September 7, 2001 || Socorro || LINEAR || NEM || align=right | 2.3 km || 
|-id=261 bgcolor=#E9E9E9
| 176261 ||  || — || September 7, 2001 || Socorro || LINEAR || — || align=right | 3.7 km || 
|-id=262 bgcolor=#E9E9E9
| 176262 ||  || — || September 7, 2001 || Socorro || LINEAR || — || align=right | 3.3 km || 
|-id=263 bgcolor=#E9E9E9
| 176263 ||  || — || September 10, 2001 || Socorro || LINEAR || — || align=right | 4.2 km || 
|-id=264 bgcolor=#E9E9E9
| 176264 ||  || — || September 11, 2001 || Socorro || LINEAR || — || align=right | 2.0 km || 
|-id=265 bgcolor=#fefefe
| 176265 ||  || — || September 12, 2001 || Socorro || LINEAR || H || align=right data-sort-value="0.92" | 920 m || 
|-id=266 bgcolor=#d6d6d6
| 176266 ||  || — || September 12, 2001 || Socorro || LINEAR || — || align=right | 4.7 km || 
|-id=267 bgcolor=#E9E9E9
| 176267 ||  || — || September 11, 2001 || Anderson Mesa || LONEOS || — || align=right | 3.0 km || 
|-id=268 bgcolor=#d6d6d6
| 176268 ||  || — || September 11, 2001 || Anderson Mesa || LONEOS || — || align=right | 3.4 km || 
|-id=269 bgcolor=#E9E9E9
| 176269 ||  || — || September 12, 2001 || Socorro || LINEAR || — || align=right | 2.3 km || 
|-id=270 bgcolor=#E9E9E9
| 176270 ||  || — || September 12, 2001 || Socorro || LINEAR || — || align=right | 3.3 km || 
|-id=271 bgcolor=#E9E9E9
| 176271 ||  || — || September 12, 2001 || Socorro || LINEAR || AGN || align=right | 2.1 km || 
|-id=272 bgcolor=#E9E9E9
| 176272 ||  || — || September 12, 2001 || Socorro || LINEAR || PAD || align=right | 3.5 km || 
|-id=273 bgcolor=#E9E9E9
| 176273 ||  || — || September 12, 2001 || Socorro || LINEAR || — || align=right | 3.8 km || 
|-id=274 bgcolor=#E9E9E9
| 176274 ||  || — || September 12, 2001 || Socorro || LINEAR || — || align=right | 2.8 km || 
|-id=275 bgcolor=#E9E9E9
| 176275 ||  || — || September 12, 2001 || Socorro || LINEAR || — || align=right | 1.7 km || 
|-id=276 bgcolor=#E9E9E9
| 176276 ||  || — || September 12, 2001 || Socorro || LINEAR || — || align=right | 4.3 km || 
|-id=277 bgcolor=#d6d6d6
| 176277 ||  || — || September 7, 2001 || Socorro || LINEAR || EUP || align=right | 7.8 km || 
|-id=278 bgcolor=#E9E9E9
| 176278 ||  || — || September 9, 2001 || Socorro || LINEAR || — || align=right | 2.5 km || 
|-id=279 bgcolor=#d6d6d6
| 176279 ||  || — || September 12, 2001 || Socorro || LINEAR || — || align=right | 5.5 km || 
|-id=280 bgcolor=#E9E9E9
| 176280 ||  || — || September 12, 2001 || Socorro || LINEAR || — || align=right | 3.2 km || 
|-id=281 bgcolor=#E9E9E9
| 176281 ||  || — || September 11, 2001 || Socorro || LINEAR || — || align=right | 2.3 km || 
|-id=282 bgcolor=#E9E9E9
| 176282 ||  || — || September 16, 2001 || Socorro || LINEAR || HEN || align=right | 1.6 km || 
|-id=283 bgcolor=#E9E9E9
| 176283 ||  || — || September 16, 2001 || Socorro || LINEAR || — || align=right | 2.6 km || 
|-id=284 bgcolor=#d6d6d6
| 176284 ||  || — || September 16, 2001 || Socorro || LINEAR || — || align=right | 3.0 km || 
|-id=285 bgcolor=#d6d6d6
| 176285 ||  || — || September 16, 2001 || Socorro || LINEAR || KOR || align=right | 1.8 km || 
|-id=286 bgcolor=#E9E9E9
| 176286 ||  || — || September 16, 2001 || Socorro || LINEAR || VIB || align=right | 3.3 km || 
|-id=287 bgcolor=#d6d6d6
| 176287 ||  || — || September 16, 2001 || Socorro || LINEAR || — || align=right | 3.2 km || 
|-id=288 bgcolor=#E9E9E9
| 176288 ||  || — || September 16, 2001 || Socorro || LINEAR || — || align=right | 4.1 km || 
|-id=289 bgcolor=#d6d6d6
| 176289 ||  || — || September 16, 2001 || Socorro || LINEAR || — || align=right | 4.0 km || 
|-id=290 bgcolor=#d6d6d6
| 176290 ||  || — || September 16, 2001 || Socorro || LINEAR || — || align=right | 5.4 km || 
|-id=291 bgcolor=#E9E9E9
| 176291 ||  || — || September 17, 2001 || Socorro || LINEAR || — || align=right | 4.6 km || 
|-id=292 bgcolor=#E9E9E9
| 176292 ||  || — || September 17, 2001 || Socorro || LINEAR || DOR || align=right | 4.8 km || 
|-id=293 bgcolor=#E9E9E9
| 176293 ||  || — || September 20, 2001 || Socorro || LINEAR || — || align=right | 3.6 km || 
|-id=294 bgcolor=#E9E9E9
| 176294 ||  || — || September 20, 2001 || Socorro || LINEAR || — || align=right | 3.8 km || 
|-id=295 bgcolor=#E9E9E9
| 176295 ||  || — || September 20, 2001 || Socorro || LINEAR || — || align=right | 2.0 km || 
|-id=296 bgcolor=#E9E9E9
| 176296 ||  || — || September 16, 2001 || Socorro || LINEAR || PAD || align=right | 3.9 km || 
|-id=297 bgcolor=#E9E9E9
| 176297 ||  || — || September 16, 2001 || Socorro || LINEAR || VIB || align=right | 3.1 km || 
|-id=298 bgcolor=#E9E9E9
| 176298 ||  || — || September 16, 2001 || Socorro || LINEAR || WIT || align=right | 1.4 km || 
|-id=299 bgcolor=#E9E9E9
| 176299 ||  || — || September 16, 2001 || Socorro || LINEAR || — || align=right | 4.1 km || 
|-id=300 bgcolor=#E9E9E9
| 176300 ||  || — || September 16, 2001 || Socorro || LINEAR || GEF || align=right | 2.0 km || 
|}

176301–176400 

|-bgcolor=#d6d6d6
| 176301 ||  || — || September 16, 2001 || Socorro || LINEAR || THM || align=right | 3.7 km || 
|-id=302 bgcolor=#E9E9E9
| 176302 ||  || — || September 16, 2001 || Socorro || LINEAR || WIT || align=right | 1.6 km || 
|-id=303 bgcolor=#E9E9E9
| 176303 ||  || — || September 17, 2001 || Socorro || LINEAR || MAR || align=right | 3.9 km || 
|-id=304 bgcolor=#E9E9E9
| 176304 ||  || — || September 17, 2001 || Socorro || LINEAR || — || align=right | 4.0 km || 
|-id=305 bgcolor=#E9E9E9
| 176305 ||  || — || September 17, 2001 || Socorro || LINEAR || PAD || align=right | 3.4 km || 
|-id=306 bgcolor=#d6d6d6
| 176306 ||  || — || September 17, 2001 || Socorro || LINEAR || — || align=right | 3.7 km || 
|-id=307 bgcolor=#d6d6d6
| 176307 ||  || — || September 17, 2001 || Socorro || LINEAR || — || align=right | 5.5 km || 
|-id=308 bgcolor=#d6d6d6
| 176308 ||  || — || September 17, 2001 || Socorro || LINEAR || — || align=right | 4.8 km || 
|-id=309 bgcolor=#E9E9E9
| 176309 ||  || — || September 19, 2001 || Socorro || LINEAR || — || align=right | 2.4 km || 
|-id=310 bgcolor=#E9E9E9
| 176310 ||  || — || September 19, 2001 || Socorro || LINEAR || AGN || align=right | 2.1 km || 
|-id=311 bgcolor=#E9E9E9
| 176311 ||  || — || September 19, 2001 || Socorro || LINEAR || PAD || align=right | 2.6 km || 
|-id=312 bgcolor=#E9E9E9
| 176312 ||  || — || September 19, 2001 || Socorro || LINEAR || — || align=right | 3.1 km || 
|-id=313 bgcolor=#d6d6d6
| 176313 ||  || — || September 19, 2001 || Socorro || LINEAR || KOR || align=right | 1.7 km || 
|-id=314 bgcolor=#E9E9E9
| 176314 ||  || — || September 19, 2001 || Socorro || LINEAR || — || align=right | 2.3 km || 
|-id=315 bgcolor=#E9E9E9
| 176315 ||  || — || September 19, 2001 || Socorro || LINEAR || — || align=right | 1.5 km || 
|-id=316 bgcolor=#E9E9E9
| 176316 ||  || — || September 19, 2001 || Socorro || LINEAR || — || align=right | 4.2 km || 
|-id=317 bgcolor=#d6d6d6
| 176317 ||  || — || September 19, 2001 || Socorro || LINEAR || — || align=right | 2.5 km || 
|-id=318 bgcolor=#E9E9E9
| 176318 ||  || — || September 19, 2001 || Socorro || LINEAR || — || align=right | 4.5 km || 
|-id=319 bgcolor=#E9E9E9
| 176319 ||  || — || September 19, 2001 || Socorro || LINEAR || RAF || align=right | 1.7 km || 
|-id=320 bgcolor=#E9E9E9
| 176320 ||  || — || September 19, 2001 || Socorro || LINEAR || GEF || align=right | 2.3 km || 
|-id=321 bgcolor=#E9E9E9
| 176321 ||  || — || September 19, 2001 || Socorro || LINEAR || NEM || align=right | 3.2 km || 
|-id=322 bgcolor=#E9E9E9
| 176322 ||  || — || September 19, 2001 || Socorro || LINEAR || WIT || align=right | 1.5 km || 
|-id=323 bgcolor=#E9E9E9
| 176323 ||  || — || September 19, 2001 || Socorro || LINEAR || — || align=right | 3.2 km || 
|-id=324 bgcolor=#E9E9E9
| 176324 ||  || — || September 19, 2001 || Socorro || LINEAR || — || align=right | 2.8 km || 
|-id=325 bgcolor=#E9E9E9
| 176325 ||  || — || September 19, 2001 || Socorro || LINEAR || — || align=right | 3.1 km || 
|-id=326 bgcolor=#E9E9E9
| 176326 ||  || — || September 19, 2001 || Socorro || LINEAR || HOF || align=right | 4.4 km || 
|-id=327 bgcolor=#d6d6d6
| 176327 ||  || — || September 19, 2001 || Socorro || LINEAR || — || align=right | 4.5 km || 
|-id=328 bgcolor=#d6d6d6
| 176328 ||  || — || September 19, 2001 || Socorro || LINEAR || — || align=right | 3.2 km || 
|-id=329 bgcolor=#d6d6d6
| 176329 ||  || — || September 19, 2001 || Socorro || LINEAR || — || align=right | 4.6 km || 
|-id=330 bgcolor=#d6d6d6
| 176330 ||  || — || September 20, 2001 || Socorro || LINEAR || — || align=right | 3.6 km || 
|-id=331 bgcolor=#d6d6d6
| 176331 ||  || — || September 26, 2001 || Anderson Mesa || LONEOS || FIR || align=right | 6.4 km || 
|-id=332 bgcolor=#d6d6d6
| 176332 ||  || — || September 18, 2001 || Kitt Peak || Spacewatch || KOR || align=right | 1.6 km || 
|-id=333 bgcolor=#E9E9E9
| 176333 ||  || — || September 20, 2001 || Socorro || LINEAR || HOF || align=right | 3.8 km || 
|-id=334 bgcolor=#E9E9E9
| 176334 ||  || — || September 20, 2001 || Socorro || LINEAR || — || align=right | 2.5 km || 
|-id=335 bgcolor=#d6d6d6
| 176335 ||  || — || September 20, 2001 || Socorro || LINEAR || — || align=right | 3.6 km || 
|-id=336 bgcolor=#E9E9E9
| 176336 ||  || — || September 21, 2001 || Socorro || LINEAR || AST || align=right | 3.5 km || 
|-id=337 bgcolor=#E9E9E9
| 176337 ||  || — || September 21, 2001 || Socorro || LINEAR || MAR || align=right | 2.2 km || 
|-id=338 bgcolor=#E9E9E9
| 176338 ||  || — || September 25, 2001 || Palomar || NEAT || MRX || align=right | 2.4 km || 
|-id=339 bgcolor=#d6d6d6
| 176339 ||  || — || September 21, 2001 || Socorro || LINEAR || K-2 || align=right | 1.6 km || 
|-id=340 bgcolor=#E9E9E9
| 176340 ||  || — || September 21, 2001 || Palomar || NEAT || MAR || align=right | 2.3 km || 
|-id=341 bgcolor=#d6d6d6
| 176341 ||  || — || September 23, 2001 || Palomar || NEAT || — || align=right | 4.9 km || 
|-id=342 bgcolor=#E9E9E9
| 176342 ||  || — || October 6, 2001 || Palomar || NEAT || MAR || align=right | 1.9 km || 
|-id=343 bgcolor=#d6d6d6
| 176343 ||  || — || October 7, 2001 || Palomar || NEAT || CHA || align=right | 3.5 km || 
|-id=344 bgcolor=#d6d6d6
| 176344 ||  || — || October 11, 2001 || Socorro || LINEAR || EOS || align=right | 3.6 km || 
|-id=345 bgcolor=#d6d6d6
| 176345 ||  || — || October 11, 2001 || Socorro || LINEAR || — || align=right | 8.7 km || 
|-id=346 bgcolor=#d6d6d6
| 176346 ||  || — || October 14, 2001 || Ondřejov || P. Kušnirák, P. Pravec || — || align=right | 3.5 km || 
|-id=347 bgcolor=#d6d6d6
| 176347 ||  || — || October 14, 2001 || Socorro || LINEAR || — || align=right | 4.8 km || 
|-id=348 bgcolor=#fefefe
| 176348 ||  || — || October 14, 2001 || Socorro || LINEAR || H || align=right | 1.3 km || 
|-id=349 bgcolor=#d6d6d6
| 176349 ||  || — || October 9, 2001 || Kitt Peak || Spacewatch || — || align=right | 3.6 km || 
|-id=350 bgcolor=#d6d6d6
| 176350 ||  || — || October 13, 2001 || Socorro || LINEAR || — || align=right | 4.2 km || 
|-id=351 bgcolor=#d6d6d6
| 176351 ||  || — || October 13, 2001 || Socorro || LINEAR || — || align=right | 4.6 km || 
|-id=352 bgcolor=#E9E9E9
| 176352 ||  || — || October 14, 2001 || Socorro || LINEAR || WIT || align=right | 1.8 km || 
|-id=353 bgcolor=#E9E9E9
| 176353 ||  || — || October 14, 2001 || Socorro || LINEAR || — || align=right | 3.0 km || 
|-id=354 bgcolor=#d6d6d6
| 176354 ||  || — || October 14, 2001 || Socorro || LINEAR || — || align=right | 2.9 km || 
|-id=355 bgcolor=#E9E9E9
| 176355 ||  || — || October 14, 2001 || Socorro || LINEAR || — || align=right | 2.2 km || 
|-id=356 bgcolor=#d6d6d6
| 176356 ||  || — || October 14, 2001 || Socorro || LINEAR || HYG || align=right | 3.8 km || 
|-id=357 bgcolor=#E9E9E9
| 176357 ||  || — || October 14, 2001 || Socorro || LINEAR || — || align=right | 4.1 km || 
|-id=358 bgcolor=#E9E9E9
| 176358 ||  || — || October 14, 2001 || Socorro || LINEAR || — || align=right | 4.5 km || 
|-id=359 bgcolor=#d6d6d6
| 176359 ||  || — || October 14, 2001 || Socorro || LINEAR || EOS || align=right | 3.0 km || 
|-id=360 bgcolor=#d6d6d6
| 176360 ||  || — || October 15, 2001 || Socorro || LINEAR || — || align=right | 4.7 km || 
|-id=361 bgcolor=#d6d6d6
| 176361 ||  || — || October 15, 2001 || Desert Eagle || W. K. Y. Yeung || — || align=right | 3.9 km || 
|-id=362 bgcolor=#E9E9E9
| 176362 ||  || — || October 13, 2001 || Socorro || LINEAR || — || align=right | 2.9 km || 
|-id=363 bgcolor=#d6d6d6
| 176363 ||  || — || October 14, 2001 || Socorro || LINEAR || — || align=right | 5.2 km || 
|-id=364 bgcolor=#d6d6d6
| 176364 ||  || — || October 15, 2001 || Socorro || LINEAR || — || align=right | 5.1 km || 
|-id=365 bgcolor=#E9E9E9
| 176365 ||  || — || October 10, 2001 || Palomar || NEAT || ADE || align=right | 3.4 km || 
|-id=366 bgcolor=#d6d6d6
| 176366 ||  || — || October 10, 2001 || Palomar || NEAT || — || align=right | 5.0 km || 
|-id=367 bgcolor=#d6d6d6
| 176367 ||  || — || October 15, 2001 || Palomar || NEAT || — || align=right | 3.8 km || 
|-id=368 bgcolor=#d6d6d6
| 176368 ||  || — || October 14, 2001 || Kitt Peak || Spacewatch || — || align=right | 3.1 km || 
|-id=369 bgcolor=#d6d6d6
| 176369 ||  || — || October 15, 2001 || Kitt Peak || Spacewatch || KOR || align=right | 1.5 km || 
|-id=370 bgcolor=#E9E9E9
| 176370 ||  || — || October 14, 2001 || Socorro || LINEAR || GEF || align=right | 2.3 km || 
|-id=371 bgcolor=#d6d6d6
| 176371 ||  || — || October 14, 2001 || Socorro || LINEAR || HYG || align=right | 3.6 km || 
|-id=372 bgcolor=#d6d6d6
| 176372 ||  || — || October 15, 2001 || Palomar || NEAT || JLI || align=right | 4.4 km || 
|-id=373 bgcolor=#d6d6d6
| 176373 ||  || — || October 15, 2001 || Palomar || NEAT || — || align=right | 5.6 km || 
|-id=374 bgcolor=#E9E9E9
| 176374 ||  || — || October 11, 2001 || Socorro || LINEAR || — || align=right | 2.5 km || 
|-id=375 bgcolor=#E9E9E9
| 176375 ||  || — || October 14, 2001 || Socorro || LINEAR || — || align=right | 2.9 km || 
|-id=376 bgcolor=#d6d6d6
| 176376 ||  || — || October 15, 2001 || Socorro || LINEAR || — || align=right | 5.6 km || 
|-id=377 bgcolor=#d6d6d6
| 176377 ||  || — || October 15, 2001 || Palomar || NEAT || — || align=right | 3.6 km || 
|-id=378 bgcolor=#d6d6d6
| 176378 ||  || — || October 8, 2001 || Palomar || NEAT || — || align=right | 6.3 km || 
|-id=379 bgcolor=#d6d6d6
| 176379 ||  || — || October 14, 2001 || Socorro || LINEAR || — || align=right | 4.4 km || 
|-id=380 bgcolor=#d6d6d6
| 176380 Goran ||  ||  || October 14, 2001 || Apache Point || SDSS || KOR || align=right | 1.6 km || 
|-id=381 bgcolor=#d6d6d6
| 176381 ||  || — || October 14, 2001 || Socorro || LINEAR || TEL || align=right | 2.2 km || 
|-id=382 bgcolor=#d6d6d6
| 176382 ||  || — || October 15, 2001 || Haleakala || NEAT || — || align=right | 3.0 km || 
|-id=383 bgcolor=#E9E9E9
| 176383 ||  || — || October 16, 2001 || Kitt Peak || Spacewatch || — || align=right | 2.0 km || 
|-id=384 bgcolor=#E9E9E9
| 176384 ||  || — || October 18, 2001 || Socorro || LINEAR || GEF || align=right | 2.2 km || 
|-id=385 bgcolor=#E9E9E9
| 176385 ||  || — || October 18, 2001 || Socorro || LINEAR || EUN || align=right | 2.5 km || 
|-id=386 bgcolor=#E9E9E9
| 176386 ||  || — || October 16, 2001 || Socorro || LINEAR || GEF || align=right | 2.0 km || 
|-id=387 bgcolor=#d6d6d6
| 176387 ||  || — || October 17, 2001 || Socorro || LINEAR || — || align=right | 3.2 km || 
|-id=388 bgcolor=#d6d6d6
| 176388 ||  || — || October 17, 2001 || Socorro || LINEAR || KOR || align=right | 1.8 km || 
|-id=389 bgcolor=#E9E9E9
| 176389 ||  || — || October 17, 2001 || Socorro || LINEAR || HOF || align=right | 4.7 km || 
|-id=390 bgcolor=#E9E9E9
| 176390 ||  || — || October 17, 2001 || Socorro || LINEAR || — || align=right | 3.0 km || 
|-id=391 bgcolor=#d6d6d6
| 176391 ||  || — || October 20, 2001 || Socorro || LINEAR || EOS || align=right | 2.4 km || 
|-id=392 bgcolor=#d6d6d6
| 176392 ||  || — || October 21, 2001 || Socorro || LINEAR || — || align=right | 4.7 km || 
|-id=393 bgcolor=#d6d6d6
| 176393 ||  || — || October 21, 2001 || Socorro || LINEAR || — || align=right | 3.4 km || 
|-id=394 bgcolor=#d6d6d6
| 176394 ||  || — || October 16, 2001 || Kitt Peak || Spacewatch || — || align=right | 3.4 km || 
|-id=395 bgcolor=#d6d6d6
| 176395 ||  || — || October 22, 2001 || Palomar || NEAT || — || align=right | 6.5 km || 
|-id=396 bgcolor=#d6d6d6
| 176396 ||  || — || October 23, 2001 || Palomar || NEAT || — || align=right | 4.9 km || 
|-id=397 bgcolor=#d6d6d6
| 176397 ||  || — || October 20, 2001 || Socorro || LINEAR || — || align=right | 5.3 km || 
|-id=398 bgcolor=#d6d6d6
| 176398 ||  || — || October 23, 2001 || Socorro || LINEAR || EOS || align=right | 2.8 km || 
|-id=399 bgcolor=#d6d6d6
| 176399 ||  || — || October 23, 2001 || Socorro || LINEAR || — || align=right | 3.9 km || 
|-id=400 bgcolor=#d6d6d6
| 176400 ||  || — || October 23, 2001 || Socorro || LINEAR || — || align=right | 3.3 km || 
|}

176401–176500 

|-bgcolor=#d6d6d6
| 176401 ||  || — || October 23, 2001 || Socorro || LINEAR || — || align=right | 2.9 km || 
|-id=402 bgcolor=#E9E9E9
| 176402 ||  || — || October 23, 2001 || Socorro || LINEAR || — || align=right | 2.5 km || 
|-id=403 bgcolor=#d6d6d6
| 176403 ||  || — || October 23, 2001 || Socorro || LINEAR || — || align=right | 3.1 km || 
|-id=404 bgcolor=#E9E9E9
| 176404 ||  || — || October 18, 2001 || Palomar || NEAT || — || align=right | 2.4 km || 
|-id=405 bgcolor=#d6d6d6
| 176405 ||  || — || October 19, 2001 || Haleakala || NEAT || TIR || align=right | 4.7 km || 
|-id=406 bgcolor=#d6d6d6
| 176406 ||  || — || October 19, 2001 || Kitt Peak || Spacewatch || — || align=right | 2.7 km || 
|-id=407 bgcolor=#E9E9E9
| 176407 ||  || — || October 23, 2001 || Palomar || NEAT || — || align=right | 2.5 km || 
|-id=408 bgcolor=#d6d6d6
| 176408 ||  || — || October 19, 2001 || Socorro || LINEAR || — || align=right | 4.6 km || 
|-id=409 bgcolor=#d6d6d6
| 176409 ||  || — || October 21, 2001 || Socorro || LINEAR || — || align=right | 2.9 km || 
|-id=410 bgcolor=#d6d6d6
| 176410 ||  || — || October 21, 2001 || Kitt Peak || Spacewatch || — || align=right | 2.6 km || 
|-id=411 bgcolor=#d6d6d6
| 176411 ||  || — || October 21, 2001 || Socorro || LINEAR || — || align=right | 3.0 km || 
|-id=412 bgcolor=#d6d6d6
| 176412 ||  || — || November 9, 2001 || Eskridge || G. Hug || — || align=right | 6.1 km || 
|-id=413 bgcolor=#E9E9E9
| 176413 ||  || — || November 11, 2001 || Socorro || LINEAR || PAL || align=right | 4.4 km || 
|-id=414 bgcolor=#d6d6d6
| 176414 ||  || — || November 9, 2001 || Socorro || LINEAR || — || align=right | 3.2 km || 
|-id=415 bgcolor=#d6d6d6
| 176415 ||  || — || November 9, 2001 || Socorro || LINEAR || EMA || align=right | 4.8 km || 
|-id=416 bgcolor=#d6d6d6
| 176416 ||  || — || November 9, 2001 || Socorro || LINEAR || — || align=right | 5.0 km || 
|-id=417 bgcolor=#d6d6d6
| 176417 ||  || — || November 9, 2001 || Socorro || LINEAR || TEL || align=right | 2.2 km || 
|-id=418 bgcolor=#d6d6d6
| 176418 ||  || — || November 10, 2001 || Socorro || LINEAR || — || align=right | 4.5 km || 
|-id=419 bgcolor=#E9E9E9
| 176419 ||  || — || November 10, 2001 || Palomar || NEAT || WIT || align=right | 2.3 km || 
|-id=420 bgcolor=#d6d6d6
| 176420 ||  || — || November 9, 2001 || Socorro || LINEAR || ANF || align=right | 2.5 km || 
|-id=421 bgcolor=#d6d6d6
| 176421 ||  || — || November 9, 2001 || Socorro || LINEAR || EOS || align=right | 3.3 km || 
|-id=422 bgcolor=#E9E9E9
| 176422 ||  || — || November 9, 2001 || Socorro || LINEAR || — || align=right | 3.9 km || 
|-id=423 bgcolor=#d6d6d6
| 176423 ||  || — || November 9, 2001 || Socorro || LINEAR || — || align=right | 4.8 km || 
|-id=424 bgcolor=#d6d6d6
| 176424 ||  || — || November 9, 2001 || Socorro || LINEAR || — || align=right | 5.0 km || 
|-id=425 bgcolor=#FA8072
| 176425 ||  || — || November 10, 2001 || Socorro || LINEAR || — || align=right data-sort-value="0.81" | 810 m || 
|-id=426 bgcolor=#d6d6d6
| 176426 ||  || — || November 11, 2001 || Socorro || LINEAR || — || align=right | 3.8 km || 
|-id=427 bgcolor=#E9E9E9
| 176427 ||  || — || November 11, 2001 || Socorro || LINEAR || JUN || align=right | 2.1 km || 
|-id=428 bgcolor=#d6d6d6
| 176428 ||  || — || November 12, 2001 || Haleakala || NEAT || — || align=right | 4.5 km || 
|-id=429 bgcolor=#d6d6d6
| 176429 ||  || — || November 12, 2001 || Socorro || LINEAR || — || align=right | 3.9 km || 
|-id=430 bgcolor=#d6d6d6
| 176430 ||  || — || November 15, 2001 || Socorro || LINEAR || EOS || align=right | 2.7 km || 
|-id=431 bgcolor=#E9E9E9
| 176431 ||  || — || November 12, 2001 || Socorro || LINEAR || — || align=right | 3.4 km || 
|-id=432 bgcolor=#d6d6d6
| 176432 ||  || — || November 12, 2001 || Socorro || LINEAR || — || align=right | 3.9 km || 
|-id=433 bgcolor=#d6d6d6
| 176433 ||  || — || November 12, 2001 || Socorro || LINEAR || — || align=right | 4.3 km || 
|-id=434 bgcolor=#d6d6d6
| 176434 ||  || — || November 12, 2001 || Socorro || LINEAR || — || align=right | 5.0 km || 
|-id=435 bgcolor=#d6d6d6
| 176435 ||  || — || November 17, 2001 || Socorro || LINEAR || — || align=right | 4.9 km || 
|-id=436 bgcolor=#d6d6d6
| 176436 ||  || — || November 18, 2001 || Kitt Peak || Spacewatch || TIR || align=right | 4.5 km || 
|-id=437 bgcolor=#d6d6d6
| 176437 ||  || — || November 17, 2001 || Socorro || LINEAR || — || align=right | 4.7 km || 
|-id=438 bgcolor=#d6d6d6
| 176438 ||  || — || November 17, 2001 || Socorro || LINEAR || NAE || align=right | 5.1 km || 
|-id=439 bgcolor=#d6d6d6
| 176439 ||  || — || November 17, 2001 || Socorro || LINEAR || — || align=right | 4.5 km || 
|-id=440 bgcolor=#E9E9E9
| 176440 ||  || — || November 17, 2001 || Socorro || LINEAR || DOR || align=right | 5.9 km || 
|-id=441 bgcolor=#d6d6d6
| 176441 ||  || — || November 17, 2001 || Socorro || LINEAR || — || align=right | 4.9 km || 
|-id=442 bgcolor=#d6d6d6
| 176442 ||  || — || November 19, 2001 || Socorro || LINEAR || CHA || align=right | 3.3 km || 
|-id=443 bgcolor=#E9E9E9
| 176443 ||  || — || November 19, 2001 || Socorro || LINEAR || — || align=right | 3.4 km || 
|-id=444 bgcolor=#d6d6d6
| 176444 ||  || — || November 20, 2001 || Socorro || LINEAR || — || align=right | 3.3 km || 
|-id=445 bgcolor=#d6d6d6
| 176445 ||  || — || November 20, 2001 || Socorro || LINEAR || KOR || align=right | 2.3 km || 
|-id=446 bgcolor=#d6d6d6
| 176446 ||  || — || December 8, 2001 || Socorro || LINEAR || Tj (2.96) || align=right | 5.6 km || 
|-id=447 bgcolor=#d6d6d6
| 176447 ||  || — || December 10, 2001 || Socorro || LINEAR || — || align=right | 5.7 km || 
|-id=448 bgcolor=#d6d6d6
| 176448 ||  || — || December 9, 2001 || Socorro || LINEAR || EOS || align=right | 4.0 km || 
|-id=449 bgcolor=#d6d6d6
| 176449 ||  || — || December 9, 2001 || Socorro || LINEAR || — || align=right | 7.2 km || 
|-id=450 bgcolor=#d6d6d6
| 176450 ||  || — || December 9, 2001 || Socorro || LINEAR || — || align=right | 4.8 km || 
|-id=451 bgcolor=#d6d6d6
| 176451 ||  || — || December 9, 2001 || Socorro || LINEAR || EMA || align=right | 5.3 km || 
|-id=452 bgcolor=#d6d6d6
| 176452 ||  || — || December 9, 2001 || Socorro || LINEAR || — || align=right | 4.7 km || 
|-id=453 bgcolor=#d6d6d6
| 176453 ||  || — || December 9, 2001 || Socorro || LINEAR || — || align=right | 5.2 km || 
|-id=454 bgcolor=#d6d6d6
| 176454 ||  || — || December 9, 2001 || Socorro || LINEAR || — || align=right | 6.3 km || 
|-id=455 bgcolor=#d6d6d6
| 176455 ||  || — || December 10, 2001 || Socorro || LINEAR || — || align=right | 3.3 km || 
|-id=456 bgcolor=#d6d6d6
| 176456 ||  || — || December 11, 2001 || Socorro || LINEAR || — || align=right | 3.0 km || 
|-id=457 bgcolor=#d6d6d6
| 176457 ||  || — || December 11, 2001 || Socorro || LINEAR || — || align=right | 3.6 km || 
|-id=458 bgcolor=#d6d6d6
| 176458 ||  || — || December 11, 2001 || Socorro || LINEAR || — || align=right | 4.8 km || 
|-id=459 bgcolor=#d6d6d6
| 176459 ||  || — || December 11, 2001 || Socorro || LINEAR || — || align=right | 5.6 km || 
|-id=460 bgcolor=#d6d6d6
| 176460 ||  || — || December 11, 2001 || Socorro || LINEAR || — || align=right | 5.0 km || 
|-id=461 bgcolor=#d6d6d6
| 176461 ||  || — || December 10, 2001 || Socorro || LINEAR || — || align=right | 4.5 km || 
|-id=462 bgcolor=#d6d6d6
| 176462 ||  || — || December 10, 2001 || Socorro || LINEAR || — || align=right | 5.0 km || 
|-id=463 bgcolor=#d6d6d6
| 176463 ||  || — || December 10, 2001 || Socorro || LINEAR || — || align=right | 5.2 km || 
|-id=464 bgcolor=#d6d6d6
| 176464 ||  || — || December 10, 2001 || Socorro || LINEAR || — || align=right | 4.3 km || 
|-id=465 bgcolor=#d6d6d6
| 176465 ||  || — || December 14, 2001 || Socorro || LINEAR || EOS || align=right | 2.8 km || 
|-id=466 bgcolor=#d6d6d6
| 176466 ||  || — || December 14, 2001 || Socorro || LINEAR || — || align=right | 3.4 km || 
|-id=467 bgcolor=#d6d6d6
| 176467 ||  || — || December 14, 2001 || Socorro || LINEAR || KOR || align=right | 1.6 km || 
|-id=468 bgcolor=#d6d6d6
| 176468 ||  || — || December 14, 2001 || Socorro || LINEAR || THM || align=right | 3.5 km || 
|-id=469 bgcolor=#d6d6d6
| 176469 ||  || — || December 14, 2001 || Socorro || LINEAR || — || align=right | 4.3 km || 
|-id=470 bgcolor=#d6d6d6
| 176470 ||  || — || December 14, 2001 || Socorro || LINEAR || — || align=right | 4.1 km || 
|-id=471 bgcolor=#d6d6d6
| 176471 ||  || — || December 14, 2001 || Socorro || LINEAR || EOS || align=right | 3.3 km || 
|-id=472 bgcolor=#d6d6d6
| 176472 ||  || — || December 14, 2001 || Socorro || LINEAR || KOR || align=right | 2.5 km || 
|-id=473 bgcolor=#d6d6d6
| 176473 ||  || — || December 14, 2001 || Socorro || LINEAR || — || align=right | 3.9 km || 
|-id=474 bgcolor=#d6d6d6
| 176474 ||  || — || December 14, 2001 || Socorro || LINEAR || — || align=right | 4.5 km || 
|-id=475 bgcolor=#d6d6d6
| 176475 ||  || — || December 14, 2001 || Socorro || LINEAR || — || align=right | 5.5 km || 
|-id=476 bgcolor=#d6d6d6
| 176476 ||  || — || December 14, 2001 || Socorro || LINEAR || — || align=right | 8.2 km || 
|-id=477 bgcolor=#d6d6d6
| 176477 ||  || — || December 14, 2001 || Socorro || LINEAR || EOS || align=right | 3.3 km || 
|-id=478 bgcolor=#d6d6d6
| 176478 ||  || — || December 14, 2001 || Socorro || LINEAR || — || align=right | 5.3 km || 
|-id=479 bgcolor=#d6d6d6
| 176479 ||  || — || December 14, 2001 || Socorro || LINEAR || EOS || align=right | 3.1 km || 
|-id=480 bgcolor=#d6d6d6
| 176480 ||  || — || December 14, 2001 || Socorro || LINEAR || — || align=right | 5.0 km || 
|-id=481 bgcolor=#d6d6d6
| 176481 ||  || — || December 15, 2001 || Socorro || LINEAR || — || align=right | 5.2 km || 
|-id=482 bgcolor=#d6d6d6
| 176482 ||  || — || December 11, 2001 || Socorro || LINEAR || — || align=right | 3.2 km || 
|-id=483 bgcolor=#d6d6d6
| 176483 ||  || — || December 11, 2001 || Socorro || LINEAR || — || align=right | 4.2 km || 
|-id=484 bgcolor=#d6d6d6
| 176484 ||  || — || December 11, 2001 || Socorro || LINEAR || HYG || align=right | 4.5 km || 
|-id=485 bgcolor=#d6d6d6
| 176485 ||  || — || December 11, 2001 || Socorro || LINEAR || — || align=right | 4.8 km || 
|-id=486 bgcolor=#d6d6d6
| 176486 ||  || — || December 15, 2001 || Socorro || LINEAR || — || align=right | 6.1 km || 
|-id=487 bgcolor=#d6d6d6
| 176487 ||  || — || December 15, 2001 || Socorro || LINEAR || — || align=right | 2.3 km || 
|-id=488 bgcolor=#d6d6d6
| 176488 ||  || — || December 15, 2001 || Socorro || LINEAR || KOR || align=right | 2.3 km || 
|-id=489 bgcolor=#d6d6d6
| 176489 ||  || — || December 15, 2001 || Socorro || LINEAR || EOS || align=right | 3.2 km || 
|-id=490 bgcolor=#d6d6d6
| 176490 ||  || — || December 15, 2001 || Socorro || LINEAR || — || align=right | 3.9 km || 
|-id=491 bgcolor=#d6d6d6
| 176491 ||  || — || December 15, 2001 || Socorro || LINEAR || HYG || align=right | 4.4 km || 
|-id=492 bgcolor=#d6d6d6
| 176492 ||  || — || December 15, 2001 || Socorro || LINEAR || HYG || align=right | 3.8 km || 
|-id=493 bgcolor=#d6d6d6
| 176493 ||  || — || December 15, 2001 || Socorro || LINEAR || — || align=right | 5.7 km || 
|-id=494 bgcolor=#fefefe
| 176494 ||  || — || December 15, 2001 || Socorro || LINEAR || — || align=right | 1.4 km || 
|-id=495 bgcolor=#d6d6d6
| 176495 ||  || — || December 14, 2001 || Socorro || LINEAR || — || align=right | 4.3 km || 
|-id=496 bgcolor=#d6d6d6
| 176496 ||  || — || December 14, 2001 || Socorro || LINEAR || — || align=right | 4.2 km || 
|-id=497 bgcolor=#fefefe
| 176497 ||  || — || December 7, 2001 || Palomar || NEAT || H || align=right | 1.3 km || 
|-id=498 bgcolor=#d6d6d6
| 176498 ||  || — || December 15, 2001 || Socorro || LINEAR || KOR || align=right | 2.5 km || 
|-id=499 bgcolor=#d6d6d6
| 176499 || 2001 YC || — || December 17, 2001 || Oaxaca || J. M. Roe || — || align=right | 4.2 km || 
|-id=500 bgcolor=#d6d6d6
| 176500 ||  || — || December 18, 2001 || Kingsnake || J. V. McClusky || — || align=right | 5.9 km || 
|}

176501–176600 

|-bgcolor=#d6d6d6
| 176501 ||  || — || December 17, 2001 || Socorro || LINEAR || KOR || align=right | 2.2 km || 
|-id=502 bgcolor=#d6d6d6
| 176502 ||  || — || December 17, 2001 || Socorro || LINEAR || — || align=right | 4.0 km || 
|-id=503 bgcolor=#d6d6d6
| 176503 ||  || — || December 17, 2001 || Socorro || LINEAR || — || align=right | 3.5 km || 
|-id=504 bgcolor=#d6d6d6
| 176504 ||  || — || December 18, 2001 || Socorro || LINEAR || — || align=right | 2.8 km || 
|-id=505 bgcolor=#d6d6d6
| 176505 ||  || — || December 18, 2001 || Socorro || LINEAR || KOR || align=right | 2.0 km || 
|-id=506 bgcolor=#d6d6d6
| 176506 ||  || — || December 18, 2001 || Socorro || LINEAR || EOS || align=right | 4.9 km || 
|-id=507 bgcolor=#d6d6d6
| 176507 ||  || — || December 18, 2001 || Socorro || LINEAR || — || align=right | 4.2 km || 
|-id=508 bgcolor=#d6d6d6
| 176508 ||  || — || December 18, 2001 || Socorro || LINEAR || URS || align=right | 5.9 km || 
|-id=509 bgcolor=#d6d6d6
| 176509 ||  || — || December 18, 2001 || Socorro || LINEAR || — || align=right | 4.8 km || 
|-id=510 bgcolor=#d6d6d6
| 176510 ||  || — || December 18, 2001 || Socorro || LINEAR || HYG || align=right | 3.7 km || 
|-id=511 bgcolor=#d6d6d6
| 176511 ||  || — || December 18, 2001 || Socorro || LINEAR || HYG || align=right | 3.9 km || 
|-id=512 bgcolor=#d6d6d6
| 176512 ||  || — || December 18, 2001 || Socorro || LINEAR || — || align=right | 5.8 km || 
|-id=513 bgcolor=#d6d6d6
| 176513 ||  || — || December 18, 2001 || Socorro || LINEAR || HYG || align=right | 3.8 km || 
|-id=514 bgcolor=#d6d6d6
| 176514 ||  || — || December 18, 2001 || Socorro || LINEAR || THM || align=right | 7.5 km || 
|-id=515 bgcolor=#d6d6d6
| 176515 ||  || — || December 18, 2001 || Socorro || LINEAR || HYG || align=right | 4.2 km || 
|-id=516 bgcolor=#d6d6d6
| 176516 ||  || — || December 18, 2001 || Socorro || LINEAR || EOS || align=right | 3.6 km || 
|-id=517 bgcolor=#d6d6d6
| 176517 ||  || — || December 18, 2001 || Socorro || LINEAR || — || align=right | 5.1 km || 
|-id=518 bgcolor=#d6d6d6
| 176518 ||  || — || December 18, 2001 || Socorro || LINEAR || — || align=right | 4.5 km || 
|-id=519 bgcolor=#d6d6d6
| 176519 ||  || — || December 18, 2001 || Socorro || LINEAR || HYG || align=right | 3.9 km || 
|-id=520 bgcolor=#d6d6d6
| 176520 ||  || — || December 18, 2001 || Socorro || LINEAR || — || align=right | 4.4 km || 
|-id=521 bgcolor=#d6d6d6
| 176521 ||  || — || December 17, 2001 || Kitt Peak || Spacewatch || THM || align=right | 2.8 km || 
|-id=522 bgcolor=#d6d6d6
| 176522 ||  || — || December 17, 2001 || Kitt Peak || Spacewatch || — || align=right | 4.5 km || 
|-id=523 bgcolor=#d6d6d6
| 176523 ||  || — || December 18, 2001 || Anderson Mesa || LONEOS || — || align=right | 6.9 km || 
|-id=524 bgcolor=#fefefe
| 176524 ||  || — || December 18, 2001 || Socorro || LINEAR || — || align=right | 1.3 km || 
|-id=525 bgcolor=#d6d6d6
| 176525 ||  || — || December 18, 2001 || Socorro || LINEAR || — || align=right | 5.6 km || 
|-id=526 bgcolor=#d6d6d6
| 176526 ||  || — || December 17, 2001 || Socorro || LINEAR || — || align=right | 5.0 km || 
|-id=527 bgcolor=#d6d6d6
| 176527 ||  || — || December 17, 2001 || Socorro || LINEAR || — || align=right | 4.1 km || 
|-id=528 bgcolor=#d6d6d6
| 176528 ||  || — || December 22, 2001 || Socorro || LINEAR || — || align=right | 7.8 km || 
|-id=529 bgcolor=#d6d6d6
| 176529 ||  || — || December 19, 2001 || Palomar || NEAT || URS || align=right | 5.4 km || 
|-id=530 bgcolor=#d6d6d6
| 176530 ||  || — || December 19, 2001 || Palomar || NEAT || EOS || align=right | 3.2 km || 
|-id=531 bgcolor=#d6d6d6
| 176531 ||  || — || December 20, 2001 || Palomar || NEAT || — || align=right | 4.7 km || 
|-id=532 bgcolor=#d6d6d6
| 176532 ||  || — || January 5, 2002 || Vicques || M. Ory || — || align=right | 4.4 km || 
|-id=533 bgcolor=#d6d6d6
| 176533 ||  || — || January 5, 2002 || Cima Ekar || ADAS || — || align=right | 4.2 km || 
|-id=534 bgcolor=#d6d6d6
| 176534 ||  || — || January 4, 2002 || Haleakala || NEAT || — || align=right | 6.8 km || 
|-id=535 bgcolor=#d6d6d6
| 176535 ||  || — || January 12, 2002 || Desert Eagle || W. K. Y. Yeung || — || align=right | 6.4 km || 
|-id=536 bgcolor=#d6d6d6
| 176536 ||  || — || January 6, 2002 || Socorro || LINEAR || — || align=right | 5.9 km || 
|-id=537 bgcolor=#d6d6d6
| 176537 ||  || — || January 5, 2002 || Haleakala || NEAT || TIR || align=right | 5.4 km || 
|-id=538 bgcolor=#d6d6d6
| 176538 ||  || — || January 5, 2002 || Anderson Mesa || LONEOS || — || align=right | 4.1 km || 
|-id=539 bgcolor=#d6d6d6
| 176539 ||  || — || January 9, 2002 || Socorro || LINEAR || — || align=right | 3.8 km || 
|-id=540 bgcolor=#d6d6d6
| 176540 ||  || — || January 9, 2002 || Socorro || LINEAR || — || align=right | 3.3 km || 
|-id=541 bgcolor=#d6d6d6
| 176541 ||  || — || January 9, 2002 || Socorro || LINEAR || — || align=right | 7.5 km || 
|-id=542 bgcolor=#d6d6d6
| 176542 ||  || — || January 8, 2002 || Socorro || LINEAR || — || align=right | 5.8 km || 
|-id=543 bgcolor=#d6d6d6
| 176543 ||  || — || January 8, 2002 || Socorro || LINEAR || — || align=right | 5.3 km || 
|-id=544 bgcolor=#d6d6d6
| 176544 ||  || — || January 9, 2002 || Socorro || LINEAR || — || align=right | 4.8 km || 
|-id=545 bgcolor=#d6d6d6
| 176545 ||  || — || January 9, 2002 || Socorro || LINEAR || — || align=right | 4.7 km || 
|-id=546 bgcolor=#d6d6d6
| 176546 ||  || — || January 9, 2002 || Socorro || LINEAR || EUP || align=right | 5.5 km || 
|-id=547 bgcolor=#d6d6d6
| 176547 ||  || — || January 12, 2002 || Socorro || LINEAR || TIR || align=right | 4.4 km || 
|-id=548 bgcolor=#d6d6d6
| 176548 ||  || — || January 9, 2002 || Socorro || LINEAR || — || align=right | 3.5 km || 
|-id=549 bgcolor=#d6d6d6
| 176549 ||  || — || January 9, 2002 || Socorro || LINEAR || HYG || align=right | 4.6 km || 
|-id=550 bgcolor=#d6d6d6
| 176550 ||  || — || January 9, 2002 || Socorro || LINEAR || — || align=right | 8.1 km || 
|-id=551 bgcolor=#d6d6d6
| 176551 ||  || — || January 9, 2002 || Socorro || LINEAR || — || align=right | 3.5 km || 
|-id=552 bgcolor=#d6d6d6
| 176552 ||  || — || January 11, 2002 || Socorro || LINEAR || Tj (2.94) || align=right | 5.7 km || 
|-id=553 bgcolor=#d6d6d6
| 176553 ||  || — || January 11, 2002 || Socorro || LINEAR || EUP || align=right | 7.7 km || 
|-id=554 bgcolor=#d6d6d6
| 176554 ||  || — || January 12, 2002 || Palomar || NEAT || URS || align=right | 5.9 km || 
|-id=555 bgcolor=#d6d6d6
| 176555 ||  || — || January 8, 2002 || Socorro || LINEAR || EOS || align=right | 3.1 km || 
|-id=556 bgcolor=#d6d6d6
| 176556 ||  || — || January 9, 2002 || Socorro || LINEAR || THM || align=right | 2.7 km || 
|-id=557 bgcolor=#d6d6d6
| 176557 ||  || — || January 9, 2002 || Socorro || LINEAR || THM || align=right | 5.0 km || 
|-id=558 bgcolor=#d6d6d6
| 176558 ||  || — || January 9, 2002 || Socorro || LINEAR || EOS || align=right | 3.2 km || 
|-id=559 bgcolor=#d6d6d6
| 176559 ||  || — || January 9, 2002 || Socorro || LINEAR || — || align=right | 3.5 km || 
|-id=560 bgcolor=#d6d6d6
| 176560 ||  || — || January 13, 2002 || Socorro || LINEAR || — || align=right | 5.1 km || 
|-id=561 bgcolor=#d6d6d6
| 176561 ||  || — || January 13, 2002 || Socorro || LINEAR || — || align=right | 3.9 km || 
|-id=562 bgcolor=#d6d6d6
| 176562 ||  || — || January 13, 2002 || Socorro || LINEAR || LIX || align=right | 5.1 km || 
|-id=563 bgcolor=#d6d6d6
| 176563 ||  || — || January 14, 2002 || Socorro || LINEAR || — || align=right | 6.2 km || 
|-id=564 bgcolor=#d6d6d6
| 176564 ||  || — || January 13, 2002 || Socorro || LINEAR || HYG || align=right | 4.9 km || 
|-id=565 bgcolor=#d6d6d6
| 176565 ||  || — || January 13, 2002 || Socorro || LINEAR || — || align=right | 5.8 km || 
|-id=566 bgcolor=#d6d6d6
| 176566 ||  || — || January 5, 2002 || Palomar || NEAT || — || align=right | 4.0 km || 
|-id=567 bgcolor=#d6d6d6
| 176567 ||  || — || January 8, 2002 || Palomar || NEAT || — || align=right | 4.2 km || 
|-id=568 bgcolor=#d6d6d6
| 176568 ||  || — || January 10, 2002 || Palomar || NEAT || — || align=right | 5.9 km || 
|-id=569 bgcolor=#d6d6d6
| 176569 ||  || — || January 11, 2002 || Socorro || LINEAR || 7:4 || align=right | 9.1 km || 
|-id=570 bgcolor=#d6d6d6
| 176570 ||  || — || January 12, 2002 || Palomar || NEAT || HYG || align=right | 3.9 km || 
|-id=571 bgcolor=#d6d6d6
| 176571 ||  || — || January 18, 2002 || Anderson Mesa || LONEOS || — || align=right | 4.7 km || 
|-id=572 bgcolor=#fefefe
| 176572 ||  || — || January 20, 2002 || Kitt Peak || Spacewatch || — || align=right | 1.0 km || 
|-id=573 bgcolor=#d6d6d6
| 176573 ||  || — || January 18, 2002 || Socorro || LINEAR || — || align=right | 7.5 km || 
|-id=574 bgcolor=#d6d6d6
| 176574 ||  || — || January 19, 2002 || Socorro || LINEAR || — || align=right | 5.4 km || 
|-id=575 bgcolor=#d6d6d6
| 176575 ||  || — || February 3, 2002 || Palomar || NEAT || — || align=right | 5.3 km || 
|-id=576 bgcolor=#d6d6d6
| 176576 ||  || — || February 4, 2002 || Palomar || NEAT || VER || align=right | 5.3 km || 
|-id=577 bgcolor=#d6d6d6
| 176577 ||  || — || February 6, 2002 || Socorro || LINEAR || — || align=right | 4.6 km || 
|-id=578 bgcolor=#d6d6d6
| 176578 ||  || — || February 6, 2002 || Socorro || LINEAR || — || align=right | 5.8 km || 
|-id=579 bgcolor=#d6d6d6
| 176579 ||  || — || February 4, 2002 || Haleakala || NEAT || — || align=right | 7.1 km || 
|-id=580 bgcolor=#d6d6d6
| 176580 ||  || — || February 3, 2002 || Haleakala || NEAT || THM || align=right | 3.8 km || 
|-id=581 bgcolor=#d6d6d6
| 176581 ||  || — || February 6, 2002 || Socorro || LINEAR || — || align=right | 5.3 km || 
|-id=582 bgcolor=#d6d6d6
| 176582 ||  || — || February 7, 2002 || Socorro || LINEAR || — || align=right | 4.5 km || 
|-id=583 bgcolor=#d6d6d6
| 176583 ||  || — || February 7, 2002 || Socorro || LINEAR || HYG || align=right | 4.6 km || 
|-id=584 bgcolor=#d6d6d6
| 176584 ||  || — || February 13, 2002 || Socorro || LINEAR || Tj (2.92) || align=right | 6.8 km || 
|-id=585 bgcolor=#d6d6d6
| 176585 ||  || — || February 7, 2002 || Socorro || LINEAR || — || align=right | 7.2 km || 
|-id=586 bgcolor=#d6d6d6
| 176586 ||  || — || February 7, 2002 || Socorro || LINEAR || — || align=right | 4.7 km || 
|-id=587 bgcolor=#d6d6d6
| 176587 ||  || — || February 7, 2002 || Socorro || LINEAR || HYG || align=right | 4.5 km || 
|-id=588 bgcolor=#d6d6d6
| 176588 ||  || — || February 8, 2002 || Socorro || LINEAR || — || align=right | 5.7 km || 
|-id=589 bgcolor=#d6d6d6
| 176589 ||  || — || February 7, 2002 || Socorro || LINEAR || — || align=right | 6.6 km || 
|-id=590 bgcolor=#d6d6d6
| 176590 ||  || — || February 8, 2002 || Socorro || LINEAR || URS || align=right | 8.0 km || 
|-id=591 bgcolor=#d6d6d6
| 176591 ||  || — || February 8, 2002 || Socorro || LINEAR || — || align=right | 6.0 km || 
|-id=592 bgcolor=#d6d6d6
| 176592 ||  || — || February 10, 2002 || Socorro || LINEAR || — || align=right | 5.4 km || 
|-id=593 bgcolor=#d6d6d6
| 176593 ||  || — || February 10, 2002 || Socorro || LINEAR || — || align=right | 6.0 km || 
|-id=594 bgcolor=#d6d6d6
| 176594 ||  || — || February 10, 2002 || Socorro || LINEAR || — || align=right | 5.4 km || 
|-id=595 bgcolor=#d6d6d6
| 176595 ||  || — || February 11, 2002 || Socorro || LINEAR || — || align=right | 5.4 km || 
|-id=596 bgcolor=#d6d6d6
| 176596 ||  || — || February 11, 2002 || Socorro || LINEAR || — || align=right | 5.0 km || 
|-id=597 bgcolor=#d6d6d6
| 176597 ||  || — || February 15, 2002 || Kitt Peak || Spacewatch || HYG || align=right | 4.2 km || 
|-id=598 bgcolor=#d6d6d6
| 176598 ||  || — || February 8, 2002 || Kitt Peak || Spacewatch || — || align=right | 4.3 km || 
|-id=599 bgcolor=#d6d6d6
| 176599 ||  || — || February 10, 2002 || Socorro || LINEAR || — || align=right | 4.8 km || 
|-id=600 bgcolor=#fefefe
| 176600 ||  || — || February 8, 2002 || Socorro || LINEAR || — || align=right | 1.3 km || 
|}

176601–176700 

|-bgcolor=#d6d6d6
| 176601 ||  || — || February 19, 2002 || Socorro || LINEAR || THB || align=right | 5.6 km || 
|-id=602 bgcolor=#d6d6d6
| 176602 ||  || — || February 19, 2002 || Socorro || LINEAR || TIR || align=right | 6.0 km || 
|-id=603 bgcolor=#fefefe
| 176603 ||  || — || March 12, 2002 || Socorro || LINEAR || — || align=right | 1.3 km || 
|-id=604 bgcolor=#fefefe
| 176604 ||  || — || March 12, 2002 || Palomar || NEAT || — || align=right data-sort-value="0.78" | 780 m || 
|-id=605 bgcolor=#fefefe
| 176605 ||  || — || March 13, 2002 || Socorro || LINEAR || — || align=right | 1.1 km || 
|-id=606 bgcolor=#d6d6d6
| 176606 ||  || — || March 13, 2002 || Socorro || LINEAR || — || align=right | 4.7 km || 
|-id=607 bgcolor=#fefefe
| 176607 ||  || — || March 13, 2002 || Socorro || LINEAR || — || align=right | 1.0 km || 
|-id=608 bgcolor=#d6d6d6
| 176608 ||  || — || March 9, 2002 || Catalina || CSS || — || align=right | 5.9 km || 
|-id=609 bgcolor=#d6d6d6
| 176609 ||  || — || March 16, 2002 || Anderson Mesa || LONEOS || EUP || align=right | 7.2 km || 
|-id=610 bgcolor=#fefefe
| 176610 Nuñez ||  ||  || March 18, 2002 || Kitt Peak || M. W. Buie || — || align=right data-sort-value="0.99" | 990 m || 
|-id=611 bgcolor=#FA8072
| 176611 ||  || — || March 20, 2002 || Socorro || LINEAR || — || align=right | 1.3 km || 
|-id=612 bgcolor=#FA8072
| 176612 ||  || — || March 20, 2002 || Socorro || LINEAR || — || align=right | 1.1 km || 
|-id=613 bgcolor=#d6d6d6
| 176613 ||  || — || April 3, 2002 || Palomar || NEAT || — || align=right | 6.2 km || 
|-id=614 bgcolor=#fefefe
| 176614 ||  || — || April 4, 2002 || Palomar || NEAT || — || align=right | 1.4 km || 
|-id=615 bgcolor=#fefefe
| 176615 ||  || — || April 8, 2002 || Palomar || NEAT || — || align=right | 1.0 km || 
|-id=616 bgcolor=#FA8072
| 176616 ||  || — || April 8, 2002 || Palomar || NEAT || — || align=right | 2.1 km || 
|-id=617 bgcolor=#d6d6d6
| 176617 ||  || — || April 8, 2002 || Palomar || NEAT || — || align=right | 3.1 km || 
|-id=618 bgcolor=#fefefe
| 176618 ||  || — || April 10, 2002 || Socorro || LINEAR || — || align=right data-sort-value="0.87" | 870 m || 
|-id=619 bgcolor=#fefefe
| 176619 ||  || — || April 10, 2002 || Socorro || LINEAR || — || align=right | 1.5 km || 
|-id=620 bgcolor=#fefefe
| 176620 ||  || — || April 16, 2002 || Socorro || LINEAR || — || align=right | 1.0 km || 
|-id=621 bgcolor=#d6d6d6
| 176621 ||  || — || May 7, 2002 || Socorro || LINEAR || 3:2 || align=right | 9.5 km || 
|-id=622 bgcolor=#fefefe
| 176622 ||  || — || May 8, 2002 || Socorro || LINEAR || FLO || align=right data-sort-value="0.97" | 970 m || 
|-id=623 bgcolor=#fefefe
| 176623 ||  || — || May 7, 2002 || Palomar || NEAT || V || align=right data-sort-value="0.92" | 920 m || 
|-id=624 bgcolor=#fefefe
| 176624 ||  || — || May 10, 2002 || Desert Eagle || W. K. Y. Yeung || — || align=right | 1.2 km || 
|-id=625 bgcolor=#fefefe
| 176625 ||  || — || May 8, 2002 || Socorro || LINEAR || NYS || align=right data-sort-value="0.96" | 960 m || 
|-id=626 bgcolor=#fefefe
| 176626 ||  || — || May 11, 2002 || Socorro || LINEAR || — || align=right | 1.1 km || 
|-id=627 bgcolor=#fefefe
| 176627 ||  || — || May 11, 2002 || Socorro || LINEAR || FLO || align=right data-sort-value="0.92" | 920 m || 
|-id=628 bgcolor=#fefefe
| 176628 ||  || — || May 15, 2002 || Haleakala || NEAT || — || align=right | 1.1 km || 
|-id=629 bgcolor=#fefefe
| 176629 ||  || — || May 13, 2002 || Palomar || NEAT || — || align=right | 1.3 km || 
|-id=630 bgcolor=#fefefe
| 176630 ||  || — || May 9, 2002 || Socorro || LINEAR || FLO || align=right data-sort-value="0.87" | 870 m || 
|-id=631 bgcolor=#d6d6d6
| 176631 || 2002 KA || — || May 16, 2002 || Fountain Hills || Fountain Hills Obs. || 7:4 || align=right | 7.2 km || 
|-id=632 bgcolor=#fefefe
| 176632 ||  || — || June 7, 2002 || Palomar || NEAT || — || align=right | 1.1 km || 
|-id=633 bgcolor=#fefefe
| 176633 ||  || — || June 5, 2002 || Socorro || LINEAR || FLO || align=right | 1.2 km || 
|-id=634 bgcolor=#fefefe
| 176634 ||  || — || June 7, 2002 || Socorro || LINEAR || — || align=right | 1.4 km || 
|-id=635 bgcolor=#fefefe
| 176635 ||  || — || June 10, 2002 || Socorro || LINEAR || — || align=right | 1.4 km || 
|-id=636 bgcolor=#fefefe
| 176636 ||  || — || June 10, 2002 || Socorro || LINEAR || — || align=right | 3.1 km || 
|-id=637 bgcolor=#fefefe
| 176637 ||  || — || June 10, 2002 || Socorro || LINEAR || — || align=right | 1.5 km || 
|-id=638 bgcolor=#fefefe
| 176638 ||  || — || June 16, 2002 || Palomar || NEAT || — || align=right | 1.1 km || 
|-id=639 bgcolor=#fefefe
| 176639 ||  || — || July 4, 2002 || Desert Eagle || W. K. Y. Yeung || FLO || align=right | 1.1 km || 
|-id=640 bgcolor=#fefefe
| 176640 ||  || — || July 11, 2002 || Campo Imperatore || CINEOS || MAS || align=right | 1.0 km || 
|-id=641 bgcolor=#fefefe
| 176641 ||  || — || July 3, 2002 || Palomar || NEAT || — || align=right | 1.7 km || 
|-id=642 bgcolor=#fefefe
| 176642 ||  || — || July 4, 2002 || Palomar || NEAT || — || align=right | 1.4 km || 
|-id=643 bgcolor=#fefefe
| 176643 ||  || — || July 4, 2002 || Palomar || NEAT || — || align=right | 1.3 km || 
|-id=644 bgcolor=#fefefe
| 176644 ||  || — || July 5, 2002 || Socorro || LINEAR || — || align=right | 1.3 km || 
|-id=645 bgcolor=#fefefe
| 176645 ||  || — || July 9, 2002 || Socorro || LINEAR || — || align=right | 1.5 km || 
|-id=646 bgcolor=#fefefe
| 176646 ||  || — || July 9, 2002 || Socorro || LINEAR || — || align=right | 1.2 km || 
|-id=647 bgcolor=#fefefe
| 176647 ||  || — || July 9, 2002 || Socorro || LINEAR || — || align=right | 1.5 km || 
|-id=648 bgcolor=#fefefe
| 176648 ||  || — || July 14, 2002 || Palomar || NEAT || KLI || align=right | 3.8 km || 
|-id=649 bgcolor=#fefefe
| 176649 ||  || — || July 14, 2002 || Palomar || NEAT || NYS || align=right data-sort-value="0.78" | 780 m || 
|-id=650 bgcolor=#fefefe
| 176650 ||  || — || July 13, 2002 || Palomar || NEAT || — || align=right | 1.6 km || 
|-id=651 bgcolor=#fefefe
| 176651 ||  || — || July 14, 2002 || Palomar || NEAT || V || align=right | 1.0 km || 
|-id=652 bgcolor=#E9E9E9
| 176652 ||  || — || July 14, 2002 || Palomar || NEAT || — || align=right | 1.3 km || 
|-id=653 bgcolor=#fefefe
| 176653 ||  || — || July 14, 2002 || Palomar || NEAT || V || align=right | 1.1 km || 
|-id=654 bgcolor=#fefefe
| 176654 ||  || — || July 4, 2002 || Palomar || NEAT || V || align=right data-sort-value="0.91" | 910 m || 
|-id=655 bgcolor=#fefefe
| 176655 ||  || — || July 6, 2002 || Palomar || NEAT || V || align=right | 1.00 km || 
|-id=656 bgcolor=#fefefe
| 176656 ||  || — || July 9, 2002 || Palomar || NEAT || — || align=right | 1.1 km || 
|-id=657 bgcolor=#E9E9E9
| 176657 || 2002 ON || — || July 17, 2002 || Socorro || LINEAR || — || align=right | 4.5 km || 
|-id=658 bgcolor=#fefefe
| 176658 ||  || — || July 20, 2002 || Palomar || NEAT || — || align=right | 1.6 km || 
|-id=659 bgcolor=#fefefe
| 176659 ||  || — || July 21, 2002 || Palomar || NEAT || — || align=right | 1.3 km || 
|-id=660 bgcolor=#fefefe
| 176660 ||  || — || July 22, 2002 || Palomar || NEAT || NYS || align=right | 1.0 km || 
|-id=661 bgcolor=#fefefe
| 176661 ||  || — || July 18, 2002 || Socorro || LINEAR || V || align=right | 1.1 km || 
|-id=662 bgcolor=#fefefe
| 176662 ||  || — || July 22, 2002 || Palomar || NEAT || — || align=right data-sort-value="0.94" | 940 m || 
|-id=663 bgcolor=#fefefe
| 176663 ||  || — || July 21, 2002 || Palomar || NEAT || V || align=right | 1.0 km || 
|-id=664 bgcolor=#fefefe
| 176664 ||  || — || August 6, 2002 || Palomar || NEAT || — || align=right data-sort-value="0.94" | 940 m || 
|-id=665 bgcolor=#fefefe
| 176665 ||  || — || August 6, 2002 || Palomar || NEAT || NYS || align=right | 1.1 km || 
|-id=666 bgcolor=#fefefe
| 176666 ||  || — || August 6, 2002 || Palomar || NEAT || NYS || align=right | 1.0 km || 
|-id=667 bgcolor=#fefefe
| 176667 ||  || — || August 6, 2002 || Palomar || NEAT || FLO || align=right data-sort-value="0.88" | 880 m || 
|-id=668 bgcolor=#fefefe
| 176668 ||  || — || August 6, 2002 || Palomar || NEAT || NYS || align=right data-sort-value="0.91" | 910 m || 
|-id=669 bgcolor=#fefefe
| 176669 ||  || — || August 6, 2002 || Campo Imperatore || CINEOS || — || align=right | 1.2 km || 
|-id=670 bgcolor=#E9E9E9
| 176670 ||  || — || August 6, 2002 || Campo Imperatore || CINEOS || — || align=right | 1.1 km || 
|-id=671 bgcolor=#fefefe
| 176671 ||  || — || August 6, 2002 || Palomar || NEAT || V || align=right | 1.1 km || 
|-id=672 bgcolor=#fefefe
| 176672 ||  || — || August 7, 2002 || Palomar || NEAT || MAS || align=right | 1.2 km || 
|-id=673 bgcolor=#E9E9E9
| 176673 ||  || — || August 5, 2002 || Socorro || LINEAR || RAF || align=right | 2.2 km || 
|-id=674 bgcolor=#fefefe
| 176674 ||  || — || August 8, 2002 || Palomar || NEAT || NYS || align=right data-sort-value="0.90" | 900 m || 
|-id=675 bgcolor=#fefefe
| 176675 ||  || — || August 8, 2002 || Palomar || NEAT || NYS || align=right data-sort-value="0.94" | 940 m || 
|-id=676 bgcolor=#E9E9E9
| 176676 ||  || — || August 8, 2002 || Palomar || NEAT || — || align=right | 2.5 km || 
|-id=677 bgcolor=#fefefe
| 176677 ||  || — || August 8, 2002 || Palomar || NEAT || V || align=right | 1.0 km || 
|-id=678 bgcolor=#E9E9E9
| 176678 ||  || — || August 4, 2002 || Palomar || NEAT || — || align=right | 1.7 km || 
|-id=679 bgcolor=#fefefe
| 176679 ||  || — || August 6, 2002 || Palomar || NEAT || — || align=right | 1.2 km || 
|-id=680 bgcolor=#fefefe
| 176680 ||  || — || August 13, 2002 || Tenagra || Tenagra Obs. || — || align=right | 1.2 km || 
|-id=681 bgcolor=#fefefe
| 176681 ||  || — || August 12, 2002 || Socorro || LINEAR || — || align=right | 1.5 km || 
|-id=682 bgcolor=#E9E9E9
| 176682 ||  || — || August 14, 2002 || Socorro || LINEAR || — || align=right | 1.2 km || 
|-id=683 bgcolor=#fefefe
| 176683 ||  || — || August 14, 2002 || Socorro || LINEAR || NYS || align=right | 1.1 km || 
|-id=684 bgcolor=#fefefe
| 176684 ||  || — || August 14, 2002 || Socorro || LINEAR || NYS || align=right | 1.1 km || 
|-id=685 bgcolor=#E9E9E9
| 176685 ||  || — || August 12, 2002 || Socorro || LINEAR || — || align=right | 3.4 km || 
|-id=686 bgcolor=#fefefe
| 176686 ||  || — || August 12, 2002 || Socorro || LINEAR || — || align=right | 1.5 km || 
|-id=687 bgcolor=#fefefe
| 176687 ||  || — || August 15, 2002 || Anderson Mesa || LONEOS || — || align=right | 1.3 km || 
|-id=688 bgcolor=#fefefe
| 176688 ||  || — || August 14, 2002 || Socorro || LINEAR || — || align=right | 1.5 km || 
|-id=689 bgcolor=#E9E9E9
| 176689 ||  || — || August 14, 2002 || Socorro || LINEAR || — || align=right | 1.7 km || 
|-id=690 bgcolor=#E9E9E9
| 176690 ||  || — || August 15, 2002 || Anderson Mesa || LONEOS || — || align=right | 1.9 km || 
|-id=691 bgcolor=#fefefe
| 176691 ||  || — || August 8, 2002 || Palomar || S. F. Hönig || — || align=right | 1.4 km || 
|-id=692 bgcolor=#fefefe
| 176692 ||  || — || August 8, 2002 || Palomar || NEAT || — || align=right | 1.1 km || 
|-id=693 bgcolor=#fefefe
| 176693 ||  || — || August 15, 2002 || Palomar || NEAT || — || align=right | 1.1 km || 
|-id=694 bgcolor=#fefefe
| 176694 ||  || — || August 11, 2002 || Palomar || NEAT || MAS || align=right data-sort-value="0.92" | 920 m || 
|-id=695 bgcolor=#E9E9E9
| 176695 ||  || — || August 26, 2002 || Palomar || NEAT || — || align=right | 1.4 km || 
|-id=696 bgcolor=#fefefe
| 176696 ||  || — || August 16, 2002 || Socorro || LINEAR || — || align=right | 1.4 km || 
|-id=697 bgcolor=#E9E9E9
| 176697 ||  || — || August 28, 2002 || Palomar || NEAT || — || align=right | 1.5 km || 
|-id=698 bgcolor=#fefefe
| 176698 ||  || — || August 28, 2002 || Palomar || NEAT || — || align=right | 1.3 km || 
|-id=699 bgcolor=#fefefe
| 176699 ||  || — || August 27, 2002 || Palomar || NEAT || V || align=right | 1.1 km || 
|-id=700 bgcolor=#fefefe
| 176700 ||  || — || August 27, 2002 || Palomar || NEAT || — || align=right | 1.3 km || 
|}

176701–176800 

|-bgcolor=#E9E9E9
| 176701 ||  || — || August 29, 2002 || Kitt Peak || Spacewatch || — || align=right | 3.5 km || 
|-id=702 bgcolor=#fefefe
| 176702 ||  || — || August 28, 2002 || Palomar || NEAT || — || align=right | 1.3 km || 
|-id=703 bgcolor=#fefefe
| 176703 ||  || — || August 29, 2002 || Palomar || NEAT || — || align=right | 1.4 km || 
|-id=704 bgcolor=#fefefe
| 176704 ||  || — || August 29, 2002 || Palomar || NEAT || — || align=right | 1.1 km || 
|-id=705 bgcolor=#fefefe
| 176705 ||  || — || August 30, 2002 || Kitt Peak || Spacewatch || — || align=right | 1.4 km || 
|-id=706 bgcolor=#fefefe
| 176706 ||  || — || August 30, 2002 || Palomar || NEAT || V || align=right | 1.2 km || 
|-id=707 bgcolor=#fefefe
| 176707 ||  || — || August 18, 2002 || Palomar || S. F. Hönig || V || align=right data-sort-value="0.92" | 920 m || 
|-id=708 bgcolor=#fefefe
| 176708 ||  || — || August 29, 2002 || Palomar || S. F. Hönig || — || align=right | 1.1 km || 
|-id=709 bgcolor=#fefefe
| 176709 ||  || — || August 29, 2002 || Palomar || S. F. Hönig || — || align=right | 1.1 km || 
|-id=710 bgcolor=#fefefe
| 176710 Banff ||  ||  || August 17, 2002 || Haleakala || A. Lowe || — || align=right | 1.4 km || 
|-id=711 bgcolor=#fefefe
| 176711 Canmore ||  ||  || August 17, 2002 || Palomar || A. Lowe || V || align=right | 1.0 km || 
|-id=712 bgcolor=#fefefe
| 176712 ||  || — || August 19, 2002 || Palomar || NEAT || — || align=right | 1.1 km || 
|-id=713 bgcolor=#E9E9E9
| 176713 ||  || — || August 20, 2002 || Palomar || NEAT || MIT || align=right | 3.0 km || 
|-id=714 bgcolor=#fefefe
| 176714 ||  || — || August 18, 2002 || Palomar || NEAT || — || align=right | 1.0 km || 
|-id=715 bgcolor=#fefefe
| 176715 ||  || — || August 29, 2002 || Palomar || NEAT || FLO || align=right data-sort-value="0.94" | 940 m || 
|-id=716 bgcolor=#fefefe
| 176716 ||  || — || August 28, 2002 || Palomar || NEAT || — || align=right | 1.2 km || 
|-id=717 bgcolor=#E9E9E9
| 176717 ||  || — || August 17, 2002 || Palomar || NEAT || — || align=right | 1.3 km || 
|-id=718 bgcolor=#E9E9E9
| 176718 ||  || — || August 19, 2002 || Palomar || NEAT || — || align=right | 1.2 km || 
|-id=719 bgcolor=#E9E9E9
| 176719 ||  || — || August 27, 2002 || Palomar || NEAT || — || align=right | 1.4 km || 
|-id=720 bgcolor=#fefefe
| 176720 ||  || — || August 17, 2002 || Palomar || NEAT || V || align=right data-sort-value="0.90" | 900 m || 
|-id=721 bgcolor=#fefefe
| 176721 ||  || — || August 19, 2002 || Palomar || NEAT || — || align=right | 1.3 km || 
|-id=722 bgcolor=#E9E9E9
| 176722 ||  || — || August 27, 2002 || Palomar || NEAT || GEF || align=right | 1.7 km || 
|-id=723 bgcolor=#fefefe
| 176723 ||  || — || August 16, 2002 || Palomar || NEAT || V || align=right data-sort-value="0.90" | 900 m || 
|-id=724 bgcolor=#fefefe
| 176724 ||  || — || September 4, 2002 || Anderson Mesa || LONEOS || NYS || align=right | 1.0 km || 
|-id=725 bgcolor=#fefefe
| 176725 ||  || — || September 4, 2002 || Anderson Mesa || LONEOS || — || align=right | 1.2 km || 
|-id=726 bgcolor=#fefefe
| 176726 ||  || — || September 3, 2002 || Campo Imperatore || CINEOS || — || align=right | 1.3 km || 
|-id=727 bgcolor=#E9E9E9
| 176727 ||  || — || September 4, 2002 || Anderson Mesa || LONEOS || PAD || align=right | 4.2 km || 
|-id=728 bgcolor=#fefefe
| 176728 ||  || — || September 5, 2002 || Socorro || LINEAR || — || align=right | 1.1 km || 
|-id=729 bgcolor=#E9E9E9
| 176729 ||  || — || September 5, 2002 || Socorro || LINEAR || — || align=right | 1.2 km || 
|-id=730 bgcolor=#E9E9E9
| 176730 ||  || — || September 5, 2002 || Socorro || LINEAR || — || align=right | 1.5 km || 
|-id=731 bgcolor=#fefefe
| 176731 ||  || — || September 5, 2002 || Socorro || LINEAR || — || align=right | 2.0 km || 
|-id=732 bgcolor=#fefefe
| 176732 ||  || — || September 5, 2002 || Socorro || LINEAR || — || align=right | 1.3 km || 
|-id=733 bgcolor=#E9E9E9
| 176733 ||  || — || September 5, 2002 || Socorro || LINEAR || — || align=right | 1.7 km || 
|-id=734 bgcolor=#fefefe
| 176734 ||  || — || September 5, 2002 || Socorro || LINEAR || — || align=right | 1.7 km || 
|-id=735 bgcolor=#E9E9E9
| 176735 ||  || — || September 5, 2002 || Socorro || LINEAR || — || align=right | 2.1 km || 
|-id=736 bgcolor=#fefefe
| 176736 ||  || — || September 5, 2002 || Anderson Mesa || LONEOS || — || align=right | 1.5 km || 
|-id=737 bgcolor=#E9E9E9
| 176737 ||  || — || September 5, 2002 || Socorro || LINEAR || — || align=right | 2.0 km || 
|-id=738 bgcolor=#fefefe
| 176738 ||  || — || September 4, 2002 || Palomar || NEAT || — || align=right | 1.6 km || 
|-id=739 bgcolor=#fefefe
| 176739 ||  || — || September 5, 2002 || Socorro || LINEAR || V || align=right | 1.1 km || 
|-id=740 bgcolor=#fefefe
| 176740 ||  || — || September 5, 2002 || Socorro || LINEAR || NYS || align=right | 1.0 km || 
|-id=741 bgcolor=#E9E9E9
| 176741 ||  || — || September 5, 2002 || Socorro || LINEAR || — || align=right | 1.2 km || 
|-id=742 bgcolor=#fefefe
| 176742 ||  || — || September 5, 2002 || Socorro || LINEAR || — || align=right | 1.6 km || 
|-id=743 bgcolor=#E9E9E9
| 176743 ||  || — || September 5, 2002 || Socorro || LINEAR || — || align=right | 1.8 km || 
|-id=744 bgcolor=#fefefe
| 176744 ||  || — || September 5, 2002 || Socorro || LINEAR || — || align=right | 1.4 km || 
|-id=745 bgcolor=#E9E9E9
| 176745 ||  || — || September 5, 2002 || Socorro || LINEAR || — || align=right | 1.3 km || 
|-id=746 bgcolor=#fefefe
| 176746 ||  || — || September 5, 2002 || Socorro || LINEAR || V || align=right | 1.1 km || 
|-id=747 bgcolor=#E9E9E9
| 176747 ||  || — || September 5, 2002 || Socorro || LINEAR || — || align=right | 2.0 km || 
|-id=748 bgcolor=#E9E9E9
| 176748 ||  || — || September 5, 2002 || Socorro || LINEAR || — || align=right | 2.4 km || 
|-id=749 bgcolor=#E9E9E9
| 176749 ||  || — || September 5, 2002 || Anderson Mesa || LONEOS || — || align=right | 1.1 km || 
|-id=750 bgcolor=#E9E9E9
| 176750 ||  || — || September 5, 2002 || Socorro || LINEAR || — || align=right | 1.3 km || 
|-id=751 bgcolor=#E9E9E9
| 176751 ||  || — || September 5, 2002 || Campo Imperatore || CINEOS || — || align=right | 1.6 km || 
|-id=752 bgcolor=#fefefe
| 176752 ||  || — || September 6, 2002 || Socorro || LINEAR || V || align=right data-sort-value="0.98" | 980 m || 
|-id=753 bgcolor=#E9E9E9
| 176753 ||  || — || September 11, 2002 || Palomar || NEAT || EUN || align=right | 1.4 km || 
|-id=754 bgcolor=#fefefe
| 176754 ||  || — || September 10, 2002 || Palomar || NEAT || — || align=right | 1.2 km || 
|-id=755 bgcolor=#E9E9E9
| 176755 ||  || — || September 10, 2002 || Palomar || NEAT || — || align=right | 1.7 km || 
|-id=756 bgcolor=#E9E9E9
| 176756 ||  || — || September 10, 2002 || Palomar || NEAT || — || align=right | 1.8 km || 
|-id=757 bgcolor=#fefefe
| 176757 ||  || — || September 11, 2002 || Haleakala || NEAT || — || align=right | 1.4 km || 
|-id=758 bgcolor=#E9E9E9
| 176758 ||  || — || September 10, 2002 || Palomar || NEAT || — || align=right | 2.0 km || 
|-id=759 bgcolor=#E9E9E9
| 176759 ||  || — || September 10, 2002 || Haleakala || NEAT || — || align=right | 1.3 km || 
|-id=760 bgcolor=#fefefe
| 176760 ||  || — || September 11, 2002 || Haleakala || NEAT || — || align=right | 1.4 km || 
|-id=761 bgcolor=#E9E9E9
| 176761 ||  || — || September 12, 2002 || Palomar || NEAT || JUN || align=right | 1.5 km || 
|-id=762 bgcolor=#fefefe
| 176762 ||  || — || September 12, 2002 || Palomar || NEAT || V || align=right | 1.1 km || 
|-id=763 bgcolor=#E9E9E9
| 176763 ||  || — || September 13, 2002 || Socorro || LINEAR || MIT || align=right | 3.2 km || 
|-id=764 bgcolor=#E9E9E9
| 176764 ||  || — || September 11, 2002 || Kvistaberg || UDAS || MAR || align=right | 1.5 km || 
|-id=765 bgcolor=#fefefe
| 176765 ||  || — || September 14, 2002 || Palomar || NEAT || MAS || align=right data-sort-value="0.94" | 940 m || 
|-id=766 bgcolor=#fefefe
| 176766 ||  || — || September 14, 2002 || Palomar || NEAT || — || align=right | 1.2 km || 
|-id=767 bgcolor=#fefefe
| 176767 ||  || — || September 14, 2002 || Palomar || NEAT || MAS || align=right | 1.2 km || 
|-id=768 bgcolor=#E9E9E9
| 176768 ||  || — || September 13, 2002 || Socorro || LINEAR || — || align=right | 1.8 km || 
|-id=769 bgcolor=#E9E9E9
| 176769 ||  || — || September 12, 2002 || Haleakala || NEAT || — || align=right | 1.4 km || 
|-id=770 bgcolor=#fefefe
| 176770 ||  || — || September 13, 2002 || Palomar || NEAT || NYS || align=right data-sort-value="0.90" | 900 m || 
|-id=771 bgcolor=#fefefe
| 176771 ||  || — || September 14, 2002 || Palomar || NEAT || V || align=right | 1.0 km || 
|-id=772 bgcolor=#fefefe
| 176772 ||  || — || September 14, 2002 || Palomar || NEAT || V || align=right data-sort-value="0.98" | 980 m || 
|-id=773 bgcolor=#fefefe
| 176773 ||  || — || September 14, 2002 || Palomar || NEAT || — || align=right | 1.7 km || 
|-id=774 bgcolor=#fefefe
| 176774 ||  || — || September 13, 2002 || Palomar || NEAT || V || align=right | 1.1 km || 
|-id=775 bgcolor=#fefefe
| 176775 ||  || — || September 14, 2002 || Haleakala || NEAT || V || align=right | 1.0 km || 
|-id=776 bgcolor=#E9E9E9
| 176776 ||  || — || September 14, 2002 || Haleakala || NEAT || EUN || align=right | 1.6 km || 
|-id=777 bgcolor=#fefefe
| 176777 ||  || — || September 14, 2002 || Palomar || R. Matson || FLO || align=right data-sort-value="0.86" | 860 m || 
|-id=778 bgcolor=#fefefe
| 176778 ||  || — || September 14, 2002 || Palomar || R. Matson || V || align=right | 1.1 km || 
|-id=779 bgcolor=#fefefe
| 176779 ||  || — || September 4, 2002 || Palomar || NEAT || LCI || align=right | 1.6 km || 
|-id=780 bgcolor=#fefefe
| 176780 ||  || — || September 15, 2002 || Palomar || NEAT || V || align=right | 1.1 km || 
|-id=781 bgcolor=#fefefe
| 176781 ||  || — || September 4, 2002 || Palomar || NEAT || — || align=right data-sort-value="0.99" | 990 m || 
|-id=782 bgcolor=#fefefe
| 176782 ||  || — || September 4, 2002 || Palomar || NEAT || — || align=right | 1.0 km || 
|-id=783 bgcolor=#E9E9E9
| 176783 ||  || — || September 26, 2002 || Palomar || NEAT || — || align=right | 1.9 km || 
|-id=784 bgcolor=#E9E9E9
| 176784 ||  || — || September 27, 2002 || Palomar || NEAT || — || align=right | 1.1 km || 
|-id=785 bgcolor=#E9E9E9
| 176785 ||  || — || September 27, 2002 || Palomar || NEAT || — || align=right | 2.8 km || 
|-id=786 bgcolor=#fefefe
| 176786 ||  || — || September 27, 2002 || Palomar || NEAT || — || align=right | 3.1 km || 
|-id=787 bgcolor=#E9E9E9
| 176787 ||  || — || September 27, 2002 || Palomar || NEAT || ADE || align=right | 3.4 km || 
|-id=788 bgcolor=#fefefe
| 176788 ||  || — || September 27, 2002 || Palomar || NEAT || — || align=right | 1.3 km || 
|-id=789 bgcolor=#E9E9E9
| 176789 ||  || — || September 26, 2002 || Palomar || NEAT || EUN || align=right | 3.7 km || 
|-id=790 bgcolor=#E9E9E9
| 176790 ||  || — || September 29, 2002 || Haleakala || NEAT || EUN || align=right | 1.9 km || 
|-id=791 bgcolor=#E9E9E9
| 176791 ||  || — || September 29, 2002 || Haleakala || NEAT || MAR || align=right | 1.9 km || 
|-id=792 bgcolor=#E9E9E9
| 176792 ||  || — || September 30, 2002 || Haleakala || NEAT || — || align=right | 1.6 km || 
|-id=793 bgcolor=#E9E9E9
| 176793 ||  || — || September 28, 2002 || Haleakala || NEAT || — || align=right | 1.1 km || 
|-id=794 bgcolor=#fefefe
| 176794 ||  || — || September 29, 2002 || Haleakala || NEAT || — || align=right | 1.6 km || 
|-id=795 bgcolor=#fefefe
| 176795 ||  || — || September 30, 2002 || Socorro || LINEAR || V || align=right | 1.2 km || 
|-id=796 bgcolor=#E9E9E9
| 176796 ||  || — || September 30, 2002 || Haleakala || NEAT || — || align=right | 1.6 km || 
|-id=797 bgcolor=#E9E9E9
| 176797 ||  || — || October 1, 2002 || Anderson Mesa || LONEOS || — || align=right | 1.7 km || 
|-id=798 bgcolor=#fefefe
| 176798 ||  || — || October 1, 2002 || Anderson Mesa || LONEOS || — || align=right | 1.4 km || 
|-id=799 bgcolor=#E9E9E9
| 176799 ||  || — || October 1, 2002 || Anderson Mesa || LONEOS || — || align=right | 1.5 km || 
|-id=800 bgcolor=#E9E9E9
| 176800 ||  || — || October 1, 2002 || Socorro || LINEAR || — || align=right | 2.4 km || 
|}

176801–176900 

|-bgcolor=#E9E9E9
| 176801 ||  || — || October 1, 2002 || Socorro || LINEAR || — || align=right | 1.6 km || 
|-id=802 bgcolor=#E9E9E9
| 176802 ||  || — || October 1, 2002 || Socorro || LINEAR || — || align=right | 2.2 km || 
|-id=803 bgcolor=#E9E9E9
| 176803 ||  || — || October 2, 2002 || Haleakala || NEAT || — || align=right | 1.1 km || 
|-id=804 bgcolor=#E9E9E9
| 176804 ||  || — || October 2, 2002 || Socorro || LINEAR || — || align=right | 1.7 km || 
|-id=805 bgcolor=#E9E9E9
| 176805 ||  || — || October 2, 2002 || Socorro || LINEAR || — || align=right | 1.4 km || 
|-id=806 bgcolor=#E9E9E9
| 176806 ||  || — || October 2, 2002 || Socorro || LINEAR || DOR || align=right | 3.8 km || 
|-id=807 bgcolor=#E9E9E9
| 176807 ||  || — || October 2, 2002 || Socorro || LINEAR || — || align=right | 1.9 km || 
|-id=808 bgcolor=#fefefe
| 176808 ||  || — || October 2, 2002 || Socorro || LINEAR || — || align=right | 1.5 km || 
|-id=809 bgcolor=#E9E9E9
| 176809 ||  || — || October 2, 2002 || Socorro || LINEAR || — || align=right | 2.2 km || 
|-id=810 bgcolor=#E9E9E9
| 176810 ||  || — || October 2, 2002 || Socorro || LINEAR || — || align=right | 1.6 km || 
|-id=811 bgcolor=#E9E9E9
| 176811 ||  || — || October 2, 2002 || Socorro || LINEAR || GEF || align=right | 1.9 km || 
|-id=812 bgcolor=#fefefe
| 176812 ||  || — || October 2, 2002 || Haleakala || NEAT || FLO || align=right | 1.3 km || 
|-id=813 bgcolor=#E9E9E9
| 176813 ||  || — || October 5, 2002 || Socorro || LINEAR || — || align=right | 1.8 km || 
|-id=814 bgcolor=#E9E9E9
| 176814 ||  || — || October 3, 2002 || Palomar || NEAT || — || align=right | 2.4 km || 
|-id=815 bgcolor=#E9E9E9
| 176815 ||  || — || October 1, 2002 || Anderson Mesa || LONEOS || — || align=right | 1.4 km || 
|-id=816 bgcolor=#E9E9E9
| 176816 ||  || — || October 2, 2002 || Socorro || LINEAR || — || align=right | 1.5 km || 
|-id=817 bgcolor=#fefefe
| 176817 ||  || — || October 3, 2002 || Socorro || LINEAR || NYS || align=right | 1.2 km || 
|-id=818 bgcolor=#E9E9E9
| 176818 ||  || — || October 1, 2002 || Haleakala || NEAT || — || align=right | 4.5 km || 
|-id=819 bgcolor=#fefefe
| 176819 ||  || — || October 4, 2002 || Socorro || LINEAR || NYS || align=right | 1.5 km || 
|-id=820 bgcolor=#fefefe
| 176820 ||  || — || October 4, 2002 || Socorro || LINEAR || — || align=right | 1.4 km || 
|-id=821 bgcolor=#E9E9E9
| 176821 ||  || — || October 4, 2002 || Socorro || LINEAR || — || align=right | 1.5 km || 
|-id=822 bgcolor=#E9E9E9
| 176822 ||  || — || October 4, 2002 || Socorro || LINEAR || — || align=right | 2.0 km || 
|-id=823 bgcolor=#E9E9E9
| 176823 ||  || — || October 1, 2002 || Socorro || LINEAR || — || align=right | 5.2 km || 
|-id=824 bgcolor=#fefefe
| 176824 ||  || — || October 2, 2002 || Haleakala || NEAT || V || align=right | 1.1 km || 
|-id=825 bgcolor=#E9E9E9
| 176825 ||  || — || October 3, 2002 || Palomar || NEAT || ADE || align=right | 2.8 km || 
|-id=826 bgcolor=#E9E9E9
| 176826 ||  || — || October 4, 2002 || Socorro || LINEAR || RAF || align=right | 1.4 km || 
|-id=827 bgcolor=#E9E9E9
| 176827 ||  || — || October 5, 2002 || Palomar || NEAT || — || align=right | 3.9 km || 
|-id=828 bgcolor=#E9E9E9
| 176828 ||  || — || October 5, 2002 || Palomar || NEAT || — || align=right | 2.0 km || 
|-id=829 bgcolor=#fefefe
| 176829 ||  || — || October 3, 2002 || Socorro || LINEAR || V || align=right | 1.3 km || 
|-id=830 bgcolor=#E9E9E9
| 176830 ||  || — || October 3, 2002 || Socorro || LINEAR || — || align=right | 1.4 km || 
|-id=831 bgcolor=#E9E9E9
| 176831 ||  || — || October 4, 2002 || Socorro || LINEAR || — || align=right | 1.9 km || 
|-id=832 bgcolor=#E9E9E9
| 176832 ||  || — || October 4, 2002 || Anderson Mesa || LONEOS || — || align=right | 2.8 km || 
|-id=833 bgcolor=#E9E9E9
| 176833 ||  || — || October 4, 2002 || Socorro || LINEAR || KON || align=right | 2.4 km || 
|-id=834 bgcolor=#fefefe
| 176834 ||  || — || October 4, 2002 || Socorro || LINEAR || V || align=right | 1.2 km || 
|-id=835 bgcolor=#E9E9E9
| 176835 ||  || — || October 5, 2002 || Socorro || LINEAR || — || align=right | 1.7 km || 
|-id=836 bgcolor=#fefefe
| 176836 ||  || — || October 4, 2002 || Socorro || LINEAR || — || align=right | 3.5 km || 
|-id=837 bgcolor=#E9E9E9
| 176837 ||  || — || October 4, 2002 || Socorro || LINEAR || — || align=right | 2.1 km || 
|-id=838 bgcolor=#E9E9E9
| 176838 ||  || — || October 4, 2002 || Socorro || LINEAR || — || align=right | 5.3 km || 
|-id=839 bgcolor=#E9E9E9
| 176839 ||  || — || October 4, 2002 || Socorro || LINEAR || — || align=right | 1.8 km || 
|-id=840 bgcolor=#E9E9E9
| 176840 ||  || — || October 7, 2002 || Socorro || LINEAR || — || align=right | 1.4 km || 
|-id=841 bgcolor=#E9E9E9
| 176841 ||  || — || October 4, 2002 || Socorro || LINEAR || — || align=right | 2.2 km || 
|-id=842 bgcolor=#E9E9E9
| 176842 ||  || — || October 5, 2002 || Anderson Mesa || LONEOS || EUN || align=right | 1.7 km || 
|-id=843 bgcolor=#E9E9E9
| 176843 ||  || — || October 5, 2002 || Socorro || LINEAR || EUN || align=right | 1.8 km || 
|-id=844 bgcolor=#fefefe
| 176844 ||  || — || October 6, 2002 || Socorro || LINEAR || — || align=right | 1.6 km || 
|-id=845 bgcolor=#E9E9E9
| 176845 ||  || — || October 8, 2002 || Anderson Mesa || LONEOS || — || align=right | 1.5 km || 
|-id=846 bgcolor=#E9E9E9
| 176846 ||  || — || October 8, 2002 || Anderson Mesa || LONEOS || — || align=right | 1.6 km || 
|-id=847 bgcolor=#E9E9E9
| 176847 ||  || — || October 7, 2002 || Haleakala || NEAT || — || align=right | 1.8 km || 
|-id=848 bgcolor=#E9E9E9
| 176848 ||  || — || October 7, 2002 || Haleakala || NEAT || — || align=right | 1.8 km || 
|-id=849 bgcolor=#E9E9E9
| 176849 ||  || — || October 6, 2002 || Haleakala || NEAT || — || align=right | 4.1 km || 
|-id=850 bgcolor=#E9E9E9
| 176850 ||  || — || October 6, 2002 || Socorro || LINEAR || — || align=right | 4.4 km || 
|-id=851 bgcolor=#E9E9E9
| 176851 ||  || — || October 6, 2002 || Socorro || LINEAR || BRG || align=right | 2.6 km || 
|-id=852 bgcolor=#fefefe
| 176852 ||  || — || October 9, 2002 || Socorro || LINEAR || — || align=right | 1.5 km || 
|-id=853 bgcolor=#E9E9E9
| 176853 ||  || — || October 9, 2002 || Socorro || LINEAR || — || align=right | 1.9 km || 
|-id=854 bgcolor=#E9E9E9
| 176854 ||  || — || October 7, 2002 || Socorro || LINEAR || — || align=right | 1.4 km || 
|-id=855 bgcolor=#E9E9E9
| 176855 ||  || — || October 9, 2002 || Socorro || LINEAR || — || align=right | 1.9 km || 
|-id=856 bgcolor=#E9E9E9
| 176856 ||  || — || October 10, 2002 || Palomar || NEAT || — || align=right | 1.2 km || 
|-id=857 bgcolor=#E9E9E9
| 176857 ||  || — || October 10, 2002 || Socorro || LINEAR || MIS || align=right | 4.8 km || 
|-id=858 bgcolor=#E9E9E9
| 176858 ||  || — || October 10, 2002 || Socorro || LINEAR || — || align=right | 4.0 km || 
|-id=859 bgcolor=#fefefe
| 176859 ||  || — || October 9, 2002 || Socorro || LINEAR || V || align=right | 1.2 km || 
|-id=860 bgcolor=#E9E9E9
| 176860 ||  || — || October 9, 2002 || Socorro || LINEAR || — || align=right | 2.0 km || 
|-id=861 bgcolor=#E9E9E9
| 176861 ||  || — || October 10, 2002 || Socorro || LINEAR || RAF || align=right | 1.7 km || 
|-id=862 bgcolor=#E9E9E9
| 176862 ||  || — || October 10, 2002 || Socorro || LINEAR || — || align=right | 4.2 km || 
|-id=863 bgcolor=#E9E9E9
| 176863 ||  || — || October 13, 2002 || Palomar || NEAT || — || align=right | 2.1 km || 
|-id=864 bgcolor=#E9E9E9
| 176864 ||  || — || October 13, 2002 || Palomar || NEAT || — || align=right | 4.2 km || 
|-id=865 bgcolor=#E9E9E9
| 176865 ||  || — || October 13, 2002 || Palomar || NEAT || EUN || align=right | 2.2 km || 
|-id=866 bgcolor=#E9E9E9
| 176866 Kuropatkin ||  ||  || October 4, 2002 || Apache Point || SDSS || — || align=right | 2.7 km || 
|-id=867 bgcolor=#E9E9E9
| 176867 Brianlee ||  ||  || October 5, 2002 || Apache Point || SDSS || — || align=right | 1.2 km || 
|-id=868 bgcolor=#fefefe
| 176868 ||  || — || October 15, 2002 || Palomar || NEAT || V || align=right | 1.1 km || 
|-id=869 bgcolor=#E9E9E9
| 176869 || 2002 UH || — || October 18, 2002 || Palomar || NEAT || — || align=right | 1.9 km || 
|-id=870 bgcolor=#E9E9E9
| 176870 ||  || — || October 27, 2002 || Socorro || LINEAR || — || align=right | 3.1 km || 
|-id=871 bgcolor=#FA8072
| 176871 ||  || — || October 29, 2002 || Socorro || LINEAR || — || align=right | 4.3 km || 
|-id=872 bgcolor=#E9E9E9
| 176872 ||  || — || October 28, 2002 || Palomar || NEAT || — || align=right | 3.2 km || 
|-id=873 bgcolor=#E9E9E9
| 176873 ||  || — || October 30, 2002 || Haleakala || NEAT || — || align=right | 2.8 km || 
|-id=874 bgcolor=#E9E9E9
| 176874 ||  || — || October 30, 2002 || Haleakala || NEAT || — || align=right | 2.3 km || 
|-id=875 bgcolor=#E9E9E9
| 176875 ||  || — || October 30, 2002 || Haleakala || NEAT || — || align=right | 1.8 km || 
|-id=876 bgcolor=#E9E9E9
| 176876 ||  || — || October 30, 2002 || Haleakala || NEAT || — || align=right | 3.6 km || 
|-id=877 bgcolor=#E9E9E9
| 176877 ||  || — || October 31, 2002 || Kitt Peak || Spacewatch || — || align=right | 1.9 km || 
|-id=878 bgcolor=#E9E9E9
| 176878 ||  || — || October 31, 2002 || Palomar || NEAT || — || align=right | 2.2 km || 
|-id=879 bgcolor=#E9E9E9
| 176879 ||  || — || October 31, 2002 || Socorro || LINEAR || ADE || align=right | 3.1 km || 
|-id=880 bgcolor=#E9E9E9
| 176880 ||  || — || October 31, 2002 || Palomar || NEAT || — || align=right | 1.9 km || 
|-id=881 bgcolor=#fefefe
| 176881 ||  || — || October 30, 2002 || Socorro || LINEAR || — || align=right | 1.5 km || 
|-id=882 bgcolor=#E9E9E9
| 176882 ||  || — || October 31, 2002 || Socorro || LINEAR || JUN || align=right | 1.6 km || 
|-id=883 bgcolor=#E9E9E9
| 176883 ||  || — || October 31, 2002 || Socorro || LINEAR || — || align=right | 4.1 km || 
|-id=884 bgcolor=#E9E9E9
| 176884 Jallynsmith ||  ||  || October 29, 2002 || Apache Point || SDSS || — || align=right | 3.3 km || 
|-id=885 bgcolor=#E9E9E9
| 176885 ||  || — || October 16, 2002 || Anderson Mesa || LONEOS || — || align=right | 3.0 km || 
|-id=886 bgcolor=#E9E9E9
| 176886 || 2002 VG || — || November 1, 2002 || Socorro || LINEAR || — || align=right | 3.5 km || 
|-id=887 bgcolor=#fefefe
| 176887 || 2002 VL || — || November 1, 2002 || Pla D'Arguines || Pla D'Arguines Obs. || PHO || align=right | 2.2 km || 
|-id=888 bgcolor=#E9E9E9
| 176888 ||  || — || November 5, 2002 || Anderson Mesa || LONEOS || — || align=right | 2.4 km || 
|-id=889 bgcolor=#E9E9E9
| 176889 ||  || — || November 1, 2002 || Palomar || NEAT || — || align=right | 1.6 km || 
|-id=890 bgcolor=#fefefe
| 176890 ||  || — || November 5, 2002 || Socorro || LINEAR || — || align=right | 1.8 km || 
|-id=891 bgcolor=#E9E9E9
| 176891 ||  || — || November 5, 2002 || Socorro || LINEAR || — || align=right | 2.8 km || 
|-id=892 bgcolor=#E9E9E9
| 176892 ||  || — || November 5, 2002 || Socorro || LINEAR || — || align=right | 2.7 km || 
|-id=893 bgcolor=#E9E9E9
| 176893 ||  || — || November 5, 2002 || Socorro || LINEAR || — || align=right | 2.9 km || 
|-id=894 bgcolor=#E9E9E9
| 176894 ||  || — || November 1, 2002 || Palomar || NEAT || — || align=right | 2.0 km || 
|-id=895 bgcolor=#E9E9E9
| 176895 ||  || — || November 4, 2002 || Palomar || NEAT || — || align=right | 1.6 km || 
|-id=896 bgcolor=#E9E9E9
| 176896 ||  || — || November 4, 2002 || Haleakala || NEAT || — || align=right | 2.4 km || 
|-id=897 bgcolor=#E9E9E9
| 176897 ||  || — || November 6, 2002 || Anderson Mesa || LONEOS || — || align=right | 3.0 km || 
|-id=898 bgcolor=#E9E9E9
| 176898 ||  || — || November 6, 2002 || Anderson Mesa || LONEOS || — || align=right | 2.2 km || 
|-id=899 bgcolor=#E9E9E9
| 176899 ||  || — || November 6, 2002 || Socorro || LINEAR || — || align=right | 1.6 km || 
|-id=900 bgcolor=#E9E9E9
| 176900 ||  || — || November 6, 2002 || Haleakala || NEAT || — || align=right | 1.6 km || 
|}

176901–177000 

|-bgcolor=#E9E9E9
| 176901 ||  || — || November 5, 2002 || Socorro || LINEAR || — || align=right | 3.9 km || 
|-id=902 bgcolor=#E9E9E9
| 176902 ||  || — || November 7, 2002 || Socorro || LINEAR || — || align=right | 2.3 km || 
|-id=903 bgcolor=#E9E9E9
| 176903 ||  || — || November 6, 2002 || Socorro || LINEAR || — || align=right | 1.2 km || 
|-id=904 bgcolor=#E9E9E9
| 176904 ||  || — || November 7, 2002 || Socorro || LINEAR || — || align=right | 3.8 km || 
|-id=905 bgcolor=#E9E9E9
| 176905 ||  || — || November 7, 2002 || Kitt Peak || Spacewatch || EUN || align=right | 2.3 km || 
|-id=906 bgcolor=#E9E9E9
| 176906 ||  || — || November 7, 2002 || Socorro || LINEAR || — || align=right | 1.4 km || 
|-id=907 bgcolor=#fefefe
| 176907 ||  || — || November 7, 2002 || Socorro || LINEAR || — || align=right | 1.4 km || 
|-id=908 bgcolor=#E9E9E9
| 176908 ||  || — || November 7, 2002 || Socorro || LINEAR || — || align=right | 2.5 km || 
|-id=909 bgcolor=#E9E9E9
| 176909 ||  || — || November 7, 2002 || Socorro || LINEAR || — || align=right | 2.2 km || 
|-id=910 bgcolor=#E9E9E9
| 176910 ||  || — || November 7, 2002 || Socorro || LINEAR || — || align=right | 3.0 km || 
|-id=911 bgcolor=#E9E9E9
| 176911 ||  || — || November 7, 2002 || Socorro || LINEAR || — || align=right | 2.8 km || 
|-id=912 bgcolor=#E9E9E9
| 176912 ||  || — || November 7, 2002 || Socorro || LINEAR || — || align=right | 3.1 km || 
|-id=913 bgcolor=#E9E9E9
| 176913 ||  || — || November 7, 2002 || Socorro || LINEAR || — || align=right | 4.8 km || 
|-id=914 bgcolor=#E9E9E9
| 176914 ||  || — || November 7, 2002 || Socorro || LINEAR || — || align=right | 2.6 km || 
|-id=915 bgcolor=#E9E9E9
| 176915 ||  || — || November 7, 2002 || Socorro || LINEAR || — || align=right | 2.8 km || 
|-id=916 bgcolor=#E9E9E9
| 176916 ||  || — || November 8, 2002 || Socorro || LINEAR || ADE || align=right | 5.1 km || 
|-id=917 bgcolor=#E9E9E9
| 176917 ||  || — || November 11, 2002 || Socorro || LINEAR || EUN || align=right | 2.1 km || 
|-id=918 bgcolor=#E9E9E9
| 176918 ||  || — || November 11, 2002 || Socorro || LINEAR || — || align=right | 1.5 km || 
|-id=919 bgcolor=#E9E9E9
| 176919 ||  || — || November 12, 2002 || Socorro || LINEAR || — || align=right | 2.5 km || 
|-id=920 bgcolor=#E9E9E9
| 176920 ||  || — || November 12, 2002 || Socorro || LINEAR || — || align=right | 1.7 km || 
|-id=921 bgcolor=#E9E9E9
| 176921 ||  || — || November 12, 2002 || Socorro || LINEAR || — || align=right | 1.9 km || 
|-id=922 bgcolor=#E9E9E9
| 176922 ||  || — || November 12, 2002 || Socorro || LINEAR || — || align=right | 3.1 km || 
|-id=923 bgcolor=#E9E9E9
| 176923 ||  || — || November 12, 2002 || Socorro || LINEAR || GEF || align=right | 1.9 km || 
|-id=924 bgcolor=#E9E9E9
| 176924 ||  || — || November 13, 2002 || Palomar || NEAT || — || align=right | 3.0 km || 
|-id=925 bgcolor=#E9E9E9
| 176925 ||  || — || November 12, 2002 || Socorro || LINEAR || RAF || align=right | 1.6 km || 
|-id=926 bgcolor=#E9E9E9
| 176926 ||  || — || November 12, 2002 || Socorro || LINEAR || HNS || align=right | 2.5 km || 
|-id=927 bgcolor=#E9E9E9
| 176927 ||  || — || November 12, 2002 || Socorro || LINEAR || — || align=right | 4.7 km || 
|-id=928 bgcolor=#E9E9E9
| 176928 ||  || — || November 12, 2002 || Palomar || NEAT || EUN || align=right | 2.7 km || 
|-id=929 bgcolor=#E9E9E9
| 176929 ||  || — || November 13, 2002 || Palomar || NEAT || RAF || align=right | 1.6 km || 
|-id=930 bgcolor=#E9E9E9
| 176930 ||  || — || November 5, 2002 || Socorro || LINEAR || — || align=right | 3.6 km || 
|-id=931 bgcolor=#E9E9E9
| 176931 ||  || — || November 12, 2002 || Socorro || LINEAR || — || align=right | 1.9 km || 
|-id=932 bgcolor=#E9E9E9
| 176932 ||  || — || November 13, 2002 || Palomar || NEAT || — || align=right | 2.5 km || 
|-id=933 bgcolor=#E9E9E9
| 176933 ||  || — || November 23, 2002 || Palomar || NEAT || — || align=right | 2.1 km || 
|-id=934 bgcolor=#E9E9E9
| 176934 ||  || — || November 24, 2002 || Palomar || NEAT || — || align=right | 2.2 km || 
|-id=935 bgcolor=#E9E9E9
| 176935 ||  || — || November 23, 2002 || Palomar || NEAT || — || align=right | 2.7 km || 
|-id=936 bgcolor=#E9E9E9
| 176936 ||  || — || November 24, 2002 || Palomar || NEAT || — || align=right | 5.4 km || 
|-id=937 bgcolor=#E9E9E9
| 176937 ||  || — || November 24, 2002 || Palomar || NEAT || — || align=right | 1.3 km || 
|-id=938 bgcolor=#E9E9E9
| 176938 ||  || — || November 27, 2002 || Anderson Mesa || LONEOS || — || align=right | 3.9 km || 
|-id=939 bgcolor=#E9E9E9
| 176939 ||  || — || November 28, 2002 || Anderson Mesa || LONEOS || — || align=right | 2.7 km || 
|-id=940 bgcolor=#E9E9E9
| 176940 ||  || — || November 28, 2002 || Anderson Mesa || LONEOS || ADE || align=right | 4.3 km || 
|-id=941 bgcolor=#E9E9E9
| 176941 ||  || — || November 30, 2002 || Socorro || LINEAR || ADE || align=right | 4.4 km || 
|-id=942 bgcolor=#E9E9E9
| 176942 ||  || — || November 24, 2002 || Palomar || S. F. Hönig || — || align=right | 2.2 km || 
|-id=943 bgcolor=#fefefe
| 176943 ||  || — || November 24, 2002 || Palomar || NEAT || — || align=right | 1.6 km || 
|-id=944 bgcolor=#E9E9E9
| 176944 ||  || — || November 23, 2002 || Palomar || NEAT || — || align=right | 2.3 km || 
|-id=945 bgcolor=#E9E9E9
| 176945 ||  || — || December 1, 2002 || Socorro || LINEAR || — || align=right | 1.5 km || 
|-id=946 bgcolor=#E9E9E9
| 176946 ||  || — || December 2, 2002 || Socorro || LINEAR || JUN || align=right | 5.4 km || 
|-id=947 bgcolor=#d6d6d6
| 176947 ||  || — || December 2, 2002 || Socorro || LINEAR || EOS || align=right | 3.5 km || 
|-id=948 bgcolor=#E9E9E9
| 176948 ||  || — || December 3, 2002 || Palomar || NEAT || — || align=right | 3.9 km || 
|-id=949 bgcolor=#E9E9E9
| 176949 ||  || — || December 5, 2002 || Socorro || LINEAR || HEN || align=right | 3.6 km || 
|-id=950 bgcolor=#E9E9E9
| 176950 ||  || — || December 2, 2002 || Socorro || LINEAR || — || align=right | 1.9 km || 
|-id=951 bgcolor=#E9E9E9
| 176951 ||  || — || December 2, 2002 || Socorro || LINEAR || DOR || align=right | 5.2 km || 
|-id=952 bgcolor=#E9E9E9
| 176952 ||  || — || December 5, 2002 || Socorro || LINEAR || NEM || align=right | 3.5 km || 
|-id=953 bgcolor=#E9E9E9
| 176953 ||  || — || December 6, 2002 || Palomar || NEAT || — || align=right | 2.7 km || 
|-id=954 bgcolor=#d6d6d6
| 176954 ||  || — || December 5, 2002 || Socorro || LINEAR || — || align=right | 4.8 km || 
|-id=955 bgcolor=#E9E9E9
| 176955 ||  || — || December 6, 2002 || Socorro || LINEAR || — || align=right | 2.4 km || 
|-id=956 bgcolor=#E9E9E9
| 176956 ||  || — || December 6, 2002 || Socorro || LINEAR || — || align=right | 2.7 km || 
|-id=957 bgcolor=#E9E9E9
| 176957 ||  || — || December 6, 2002 || Socorro || LINEAR || — || align=right | 3.3 km || 
|-id=958 bgcolor=#E9E9E9
| 176958 ||  || — || December 6, 2002 || Socorro || LINEAR || — || align=right | 2.4 km || 
|-id=959 bgcolor=#E9E9E9
| 176959 ||  || — || December 6, 2002 || Socorro || LINEAR || WIT || align=right | 1.9 km || 
|-id=960 bgcolor=#E9E9E9
| 176960 ||  || — || December 8, 2002 || Palomar || NEAT || JUN || align=right | 4.0 km || 
|-id=961 bgcolor=#E9E9E9
| 176961 ||  || — || December 10, 2002 || Socorro || LINEAR || — || align=right | 3.6 km || 
|-id=962 bgcolor=#E9E9E9
| 176962 ||  || — || December 10, 2002 || Socorro || LINEAR || — || align=right | 2.7 km || 
|-id=963 bgcolor=#E9E9E9
| 176963 ||  || — || December 10, 2002 || Socorro || LINEAR || — || align=right | 4.0 km || 
|-id=964 bgcolor=#E9E9E9
| 176964 ||  || — || December 10, 2002 || Palomar || NEAT || — || align=right | 4.1 km || 
|-id=965 bgcolor=#E9E9E9
| 176965 ||  || — || December 10, 2002 || Palomar || NEAT || GEF || align=right | 2.3 km || 
|-id=966 bgcolor=#E9E9E9
| 176966 ||  || — || December 10, 2002 || Palomar || NEAT || — || align=right | 3.7 km || 
|-id=967 bgcolor=#E9E9E9
| 176967 ||  || — || December 8, 2002 || Haleakala || NEAT || ADE || align=right | 3.5 km || 
|-id=968 bgcolor=#E9E9E9
| 176968 ||  || — || December 10, 2002 || Socorro || LINEAR || MAR || align=right | 1.8 km || 
|-id=969 bgcolor=#E9E9E9
| 176969 ||  || — || December 10, 2002 || Socorro || LINEAR || MIT || align=right | 3.3 km || 
|-id=970 bgcolor=#d6d6d6
| 176970 ||  || — || December 10, 2002 || Palomar || NEAT || — || align=right | 4.8 km || 
|-id=971 bgcolor=#E9E9E9
| 176971 ||  || — || December 11, 2002 || Socorro || LINEAR || — || align=right | 2.8 km || 
|-id=972 bgcolor=#E9E9E9
| 176972 ||  || — || December 11, 2002 || Socorro || LINEAR || — || align=right | 2.2 km || 
|-id=973 bgcolor=#E9E9E9
| 176973 ||  || — || December 11, 2002 || Socorro || LINEAR || — || align=right | 4.4 km || 
|-id=974 bgcolor=#d6d6d6
| 176974 ||  || — || December 11, 2002 || Socorro || LINEAR || — || align=right | 5.1 km || 
|-id=975 bgcolor=#E9E9E9
| 176975 ||  || — || December 10, 2002 || Palomar || NEAT || — || align=right | 2.6 km || 
|-id=976 bgcolor=#E9E9E9
| 176976 ||  || — || December 11, 2002 || Socorro || LINEAR || ADE || align=right | 4.0 km || 
|-id=977 bgcolor=#E9E9E9
| 176977 ||  || — || December 12, 2002 || Palomar || NEAT || JUN || align=right | 1.6 km || 
|-id=978 bgcolor=#E9E9E9
| 176978 ||  || — || December 15, 2002 || Haleakala || NEAT || — || align=right | 2.9 km || 
|-id=979 bgcolor=#E9E9E9
| 176979 ||  || — || December 5, 2002 || Socorro || LINEAR || — || align=right | 3.1 km || 
|-id=980 bgcolor=#E9E9E9
| 176980 ||  || — || December 5, 2002 || Socorro || LINEAR || — || align=right | 3.3 km || 
|-id=981 bgcolor=#d6d6d6
| 176981 Anteradonic ||  ||  || December 11, 2002 || Apache Point || SDSS || — || align=right | 4.2 km || 
|-id=982 bgcolor=#E9E9E9
| 176982 ||  || — || December 29, 2002 || Socorro || LINEAR || — || align=right | 3.6 km || 
|-id=983 bgcolor=#E9E9E9
| 176983 ||  || — || December 31, 2002 || Socorro || LINEAR || — || align=right | 2.6 km || 
|-id=984 bgcolor=#E9E9E9
| 176984 ||  || — || December 31, 2002 || Socorro || LINEAR || — || align=right | 2.5 km || 
|-id=985 bgcolor=#E9E9E9
| 176985 ||  || — || December 31, 2002 || Socorro || LINEAR || — || align=right | 2.5 km || 
|-id=986 bgcolor=#E9E9E9
| 176986 ||  || — || December 31, 2002 || Socorro || LINEAR || — || align=right | 3.6 km || 
|-id=987 bgcolor=#d6d6d6
| 176987 ||  || — || December 31, 2002 || Socorro || LINEAR || — || align=right | 6.4 km || 
|-id=988 bgcolor=#d6d6d6
| 176988 ||  || — || December 31, 2002 || Socorro || LINEAR || — || align=right | 5.2 km || 
|-id=989 bgcolor=#d6d6d6
| 176989 ||  || — || January 1, 2003 || Needville || Needville Obs. || — || align=right | 6.1 km || 
|-id=990 bgcolor=#E9E9E9
| 176990 ||  || — || January 4, 2003 || Socorro || LINEAR || — || align=right | 2.5 km || 
|-id=991 bgcolor=#E9E9E9
| 176991 ||  || — || January 1, 2003 || Socorro || LINEAR || — || align=right | 3.8 km || 
|-id=992 bgcolor=#E9E9E9
| 176992 ||  || — || January 1, 2003 || Socorro || LINEAR || — || align=right | 4.4 km || 
|-id=993 bgcolor=#E9E9E9
| 176993 ||  || — || January 1, 2003 || Socorro || LINEAR || GEF || align=right | 2.1 km || 
|-id=994 bgcolor=#fefefe
| 176994 ||  || — || January 4, 2003 || Socorro || LINEAR || — || align=right | 2.6 km || 
|-id=995 bgcolor=#d6d6d6
| 176995 ||  || — || January 4, 2003 || Socorro || LINEAR || — || align=right | 3.5 km || 
|-id=996 bgcolor=#E9E9E9
| 176996 ||  || — || January 5, 2003 || Tebbutt || F. B. Zoltowski || — || align=right | 4.5 km || 
|-id=997 bgcolor=#E9E9E9
| 176997 ||  || — || January 4, 2003 || Socorro || LINEAR || — || align=right | 3.2 km || 
|-id=998 bgcolor=#E9E9E9
| 176998 ||  || — || January 4, 2003 || Socorro || LINEAR || PAE || align=right | 4.6 km || 
|-id=999 bgcolor=#E9E9E9
| 176999 ||  || — || January 7, 2003 || Socorro || LINEAR || — || align=right | 5.1 km || 
|-id=000 bgcolor=#d6d6d6
| 177000 ||  || — || January 7, 2003 || Socorro || LINEAR || — || align=right | 6.5 km || 
|}

References

External links 
 Discovery Circumstances: Numbered Minor Planets (175001)–(180000) (IAU Minor Planet Center)

0176